

202001–202100 

|-bgcolor=#fefefe
| 202001 ||  || — || August 9, 2004 || Anderson Mesa || LONEOS || NYS || align=right data-sort-value="0.94" | 940 m || 
|-id=002 bgcolor=#fefefe
| 202002 ||  || — || August 22, 2004 || WISE || Wise Obs. || FLO || align=right data-sort-value="0.83" | 830 m || 
|-id=003 bgcolor=#E9E9E9
| 202003 ||  || — || August 21, 2004 || Siding Spring || SSS || — || align=right | 1.4 km || 
|-id=004 bgcolor=#fefefe
| 202004 ||  || — || August 21, 2004 || Siding Spring || SSS || — || align=right | 1.3 km || 
|-id=005 bgcolor=#fefefe
| 202005 ||  || — || August 24, 2004 || Socorro || LINEAR || — || align=right | 2.4 km || 
|-id=006 bgcolor=#fefefe
| 202006 ||  || — || August 24, 2004 || Socorro || LINEAR || PHO || align=right | 2.5 km || 
|-id=007 bgcolor=#fefefe
| 202007 ||  || — || August 26, 2004 || Catalina || CSS || NYS || align=right | 1.0 km || 
|-id=008 bgcolor=#fefefe
| 202008 ||  || — || August 21, 2004 || Siding Spring || SSS || — || align=right | 1.0 km || 
|-id=009 bgcolor=#fefefe
| 202009 ||  || — || September 4, 2004 || Palomar || NEAT || — || align=right | 1.3 km || 
|-id=010 bgcolor=#fefefe
| 202010 ||  || — || September 8, 2004 || Saint-Véran || Saint-Véran Obs. || NYS || align=right data-sort-value="0.96" | 960 m || 
|-id=011 bgcolor=#fefefe
| 202011 ||  || — || September 7, 2004 || Socorro || LINEAR || — || align=right | 1.1 km || 
|-id=012 bgcolor=#fefefe
| 202012 ||  || — || September 7, 2004 || Socorro || LINEAR || PHO || align=right | 1.5 km || 
|-id=013 bgcolor=#fefefe
| 202013 ||  || — || September 6, 2004 || Siding Spring || SSS || NYS || align=right data-sort-value="0.96" | 960 m || 
|-id=014 bgcolor=#fefefe
| 202014 ||  || — || September 6, 2004 || Siding Spring || SSS || — || align=right | 1.1 km || 
|-id=015 bgcolor=#fefefe
| 202015 ||  || — || September 7, 2004 || Socorro || LINEAR || V || align=right | 1.0 km || 
|-id=016 bgcolor=#fefefe
| 202016 ||  || — || September 7, 2004 || Socorro || LINEAR || MAS || align=right | 1.0 km || 
|-id=017 bgcolor=#fefefe
| 202017 ||  || — || September 7, 2004 || Socorro || LINEAR || NYS || align=right data-sort-value="0.82" | 820 m || 
|-id=018 bgcolor=#fefefe
| 202018 ||  || — || September 8, 2004 || Socorro || LINEAR || NYS || align=right data-sort-value="0.86" | 860 m || 
|-id=019 bgcolor=#fefefe
| 202019 ||  || — || September 8, 2004 || Socorro || LINEAR || V || align=right data-sort-value="0.99" | 990 m || 
|-id=020 bgcolor=#fefefe
| 202020 ||  || — || September 8, 2004 || Socorro || LINEAR || NYS || align=right data-sort-value="0.73" | 730 m || 
|-id=021 bgcolor=#fefefe
| 202021 ||  || — || September 8, 2004 || Socorro || LINEAR || — || align=right | 1.1 km || 
|-id=022 bgcolor=#fefefe
| 202022 ||  || — || September 8, 2004 || Socorro || LINEAR || — || align=right | 1.4 km || 
|-id=023 bgcolor=#fefefe
| 202023 ||  || — || September 8, 2004 || Socorro || LINEAR || — || align=right | 1.1 km || 
|-id=024 bgcolor=#fefefe
| 202024 ||  || — || September 8, 2004 || Socorro || LINEAR || FLO || align=right data-sort-value="0.75" | 750 m || 
|-id=025 bgcolor=#fefefe
| 202025 ||  || — || September 8, 2004 || Socorro || LINEAR || MAS || align=right data-sort-value="0.96" | 960 m || 
|-id=026 bgcolor=#fefefe
| 202026 ||  || — || September 8, 2004 || Socorro || LINEAR || — || align=right | 1.2 km || 
|-id=027 bgcolor=#fefefe
| 202027 ||  || — || September 8, 2004 || Socorro || LINEAR || NYS || align=right data-sort-value="0.88" | 880 m || 
|-id=028 bgcolor=#fefefe
| 202028 ||  || — || September 8, 2004 || Socorro || LINEAR || NYS || align=right | 1.2 km || 
|-id=029 bgcolor=#fefefe
| 202029 ||  || — || September 8, 2004 || Socorro || LINEAR || — || align=right data-sort-value="0.94" | 940 m || 
|-id=030 bgcolor=#fefefe
| 202030 ||  || — || September 8, 2004 || Socorro || LINEAR || — || align=right | 1.2 km || 
|-id=031 bgcolor=#fefefe
| 202031 ||  || — || September 8, 2004 || Socorro || LINEAR || — || align=right | 1.5 km || 
|-id=032 bgcolor=#fefefe
| 202032 ||  || — || September 8, 2004 || Socorro || LINEAR || — || align=right | 1.5 km || 
|-id=033 bgcolor=#fefefe
| 202033 ||  || — || September 8, 2004 || Socorro || LINEAR || V || align=right data-sort-value="0.96" | 960 m || 
|-id=034 bgcolor=#fefefe
| 202034 ||  || — || September 8, 2004 || Socorro || LINEAR || — || align=right | 2.1 km || 
|-id=035 bgcolor=#fefefe
| 202035 ||  || — || September 8, 2004 || Socorro || LINEAR || — || align=right | 1.3 km || 
|-id=036 bgcolor=#fefefe
| 202036 ||  || — || September 8, 2004 || Socorro || LINEAR || MAS || align=right | 1.1 km || 
|-id=037 bgcolor=#fefefe
| 202037 ||  || — || September 9, 2004 || Bergisch Gladbach || W. Bickel || NYS || align=right data-sort-value="0.82" | 820 m || 
|-id=038 bgcolor=#fefefe
| 202038 ||  || — || September 8, 2004 || Socorro || LINEAR || — || align=right | 1.4 km || 
|-id=039 bgcolor=#fefefe
| 202039 ||  || — || September 8, 2004 || Palomar || NEAT || FLO || align=right data-sort-value="0.98" | 980 m || 
|-id=040 bgcolor=#fefefe
| 202040 ||  || — || September 8, 2004 || Palomar || NEAT || — || align=right | 1.4 km || 
|-id=041 bgcolor=#fefefe
| 202041 ||  || — || September 9, 2004 || Kitt Peak || Spacewatch || — || align=right | 1.1 km || 
|-id=042 bgcolor=#fefefe
| 202042 ||  || — || September 7, 2004 || Kitt Peak || Spacewatch || NYS || align=right data-sort-value="0.85" | 850 m || 
|-id=043 bgcolor=#fefefe
| 202043 ||  || — || September 8, 2004 || Socorro || LINEAR || NYS || align=right | 1.1 km || 
|-id=044 bgcolor=#fefefe
| 202044 ||  || — || September 9, 2004 || Socorro || LINEAR || V || align=right data-sort-value="0.80" | 800 m || 
|-id=045 bgcolor=#fefefe
| 202045 ||  || — || September 9, 2004 || Socorro || LINEAR || NYS || align=right data-sort-value="0.84" | 840 m || 
|-id=046 bgcolor=#fefefe
| 202046 ||  || — || September 10, 2004 || Socorro || LINEAR || V || align=right | 1.1 km || 
|-id=047 bgcolor=#fefefe
| 202047 ||  || — || September 10, 2004 || Socorro || LINEAR || — || align=right | 3.7 km || 
|-id=048 bgcolor=#fefefe
| 202048 ||  || — || September 10, 2004 || Socorro || LINEAR || — || align=right | 1.3 km || 
|-id=049 bgcolor=#fefefe
| 202049 ||  || — || September 7, 2004 || Socorro || LINEAR || — || align=right | 1.2 km || 
|-id=050 bgcolor=#fefefe
| 202050 ||  || — || September 7, 2004 || Socorro || LINEAR || — || align=right | 1.2 km || 
|-id=051 bgcolor=#E9E9E9
| 202051 ||  || — || September 10, 2004 || Socorro || LINEAR || EUN || align=right | 1.4 km || 
|-id=052 bgcolor=#E9E9E9
| 202052 ||  || — || September 10, 2004 || Socorro || LINEAR || — || align=right | 3.0 km || 
|-id=053 bgcolor=#fefefe
| 202053 ||  || — || September 10, 2004 || Socorro || LINEAR || FLO || align=right | 1.1 km || 
|-id=054 bgcolor=#fefefe
| 202054 ||  || — || September 10, 2004 || Socorro || LINEAR || — || align=right | 1.3 km || 
|-id=055 bgcolor=#E9E9E9
| 202055 ||  || — || September 10, 2004 || Socorro || LINEAR || — || align=right | 3.9 km || 
|-id=056 bgcolor=#fefefe
| 202056 ||  || — || September 9, 2004 || Kitt Peak || Spacewatch || — || align=right | 1.3 km || 
|-id=057 bgcolor=#fefefe
| 202057 ||  || — || September 9, 2004 || Kitt Peak || Spacewatch || — || align=right | 1.2 km || 
|-id=058 bgcolor=#fefefe
| 202058 ||  || — || September 13, 2004 || Socorro || LINEAR || NYS || align=right data-sort-value="0.74" | 740 m || 
|-id=059 bgcolor=#fefefe
| 202059 ||  || — || September 10, 2004 || Kitt Peak || Spacewatch || MAS || align=right data-sort-value="0.85" | 850 m || 
|-id=060 bgcolor=#fefefe
| 202060 ||  || — || September 10, 2004 || Socorro || LINEAR || V || align=right data-sort-value="0.91" | 910 m || 
|-id=061 bgcolor=#fefefe
| 202061 ||  || — || September 10, 2004 || Socorro || LINEAR || V || align=right | 1.1 km || 
|-id=062 bgcolor=#fefefe
| 202062 ||  || — || September 13, 2004 || Socorro || LINEAR || FLO || align=right | 1.2 km || 
|-id=063 bgcolor=#fefefe
| 202063 ||  || — || September 13, 2004 || Socorro || LINEAR || V || align=right | 1.3 km || 
|-id=064 bgcolor=#fefefe
| 202064 ||  || — || September 15, 2004 || Anderson Mesa || LONEOS || — || align=right | 1.3 km || 
|-id=065 bgcolor=#fefefe
| 202065 ||  || — || September 15, 2004 || Kitt Peak || Spacewatch || CLA || align=right | 2.5 km || 
|-id=066 bgcolor=#fefefe
| 202066 ||  || — || September 8, 2004 || Socorro || LINEAR || — || align=right | 1.3 km || 
|-id=067 bgcolor=#fefefe
| 202067 ||  || — || September 8, 2004 || Socorro || LINEAR || FLO || align=right data-sort-value="0.99" | 990 m || 
|-id=068 bgcolor=#fefefe
| 202068 ||  || — || September 17, 2004 || Socorro || LINEAR || MAS || align=right data-sort-value="0.96" | 960 m || 
|-id=069 bgcolor=#fefefe
| 202069 ||  || — || September 17, 2004 || Kitt Peak || Spacewatch || — || align=right | 1.1 km || 
|-id=070 bgcolor=#fefefe
| 202070 ||  || — || September 16, 2004 || Siding Spring || SSS || — || align=right | 1.3 km || 
|-id=071 bgcolor=#E9E9E9
| 202071 ||  || — || September 17, 2004 || Desert Eagle || W. K. Y. Yeung || — || align=right | 1.4 km || 
|-id=072 bgcolor=#fefefe
| 202072 ||  || — || September 17, 2004 || Kitt Peak || Spacewatch || — || align=right | 1.1 km || 
|-id=073 bgcolor=#E9E9E9
| 202073 ||  || — || September 17, 2004 || Kitt Peak || Spacewatch || — || align=right data-sort-value="0.93" | 930 m || 
|-id=074 bgcolor=#fefefe
| 202074 ||  || — || September 18, 2004 || Socorro || LINEAR || — || align=right | 1.1 km || 
|-id=075 bgcolor=#fefefe
| 202075 ||  || — || September 17, 2004 || Socorro || LINEAR || — || align=right | 1.0 km || 
|-id=076 bgcolor=#fefefe
| 202076 ||  || — || September 17, 2004 || Socorro || LINEAR || — || align=right | 1.4 km || 
|-id=077 bgcolor=#fefefe
| 202077 ||  || — || September 17, 2004 || Socorro || LINEAR || — || align=right | 1.9 km || 
|-id=078 bgcolor=#fefefe
| 202078 ||  || — || September 17, 2004 || Socorro || LINEAR || NYS || align=right data-sort-value="0.99" | 990 m || 
|-id=079 bgcolor=#FA8072
| 202079 ||  || — || September 17, 2004 || Socorro || LINEAR || — || align=right | 1.3 km || 
|-id=080 bgcolor=#E9E9E9
| 202080 ||  || — || September 17, 2004 || Socorro || LINEAR || — || align=right | 3.0 km || 
|-id=081 bgcolor=#fefefe
| 202081 ||  || — || September 22, 2004 || Socorro || LINEAR || — || align=right | 1.2 km || 
|-id=082 bgcolor=#fefefe
| 202082 ||  || — || September 17, 2004 || Socorro || LINEAR || — || align=right | 1.0 km || 
|-id=083 bgcolor=#fefefe
| 202083 ||  || — || September 22, 2004 || Socorro || LINEAR || — || align=right | 1.4 km || 
|-id=084 bgcolor=#fefefe
| 202084 ||  || — || September 30, 2004 || Wrightwood || J. W. Young || — || align=right | 1.00 km || 
|-id=085 bgcolor=#E9E9E9
| 202085 ||  || — || September 18, 2004 || Socorro || LINEAR || — || align=right | 1.5 km || 
|-id=086 bgcolor=#fefefe
| 202086 || 2004 TZ || — || October 3, 2004 || Palomar || NEAT || — || align=right | 1.4 km || 
|-id=087 bgcolor=#fefefe
| 202087 ||  || — || October 3, 2004 || Palomar || NEAT || — || align=right | 1.3 km || 
|-id=088 bgcolor=#E9E9E9
| 202088 ||  || — || October 4, 2004 || Kitt Peak || Spacewatch || — || align=right | 1.1 km || 
|-id=089 bgcolor=#fefefe
| 202089 ||  || — || October 4, 2004 || Kitt Peak || Spacewatch || — || align=right | 1.1 km || 
|-id=090 bgcolor=#fefefe
| 202090 ||  || — || October 5, 2004 || Socorro || LINEAR || — || align=right | 1.6 km || 
|-id=091 bgcolor=#E9E9E9
| 202091 ||  || — || October 9, 2004 || Socorro || LINEAR || — || align=right | 1.3 km || 
|-id=092 bgcolor=#E9E9E9
| 202092 Algirdas ||  ||  || October 11, 2004 || Moletai || K. Černis || JUN || align=right | 1.0 km || 
|-id=093 bgcolor=#E9E9E9
| 202093 Jogaila ||  ||  || October 11, 2004 || Moletai || K. Černis, J. Zdanavičius || — || align=right | 3.0 km || 
|-id=094 bgcolor=#E9E9E9
| 202094 ||  || — || October 12, 2004 || Goodricke-Pigott || R. A. Tucker || ADE || align=right | 4.9 km || 
|-id=095 bgcolor=#fefefe
| 202095 ||  || — || October 5, 2004 || Palomar || NEAT || FLO || align=right data-sort-value="0.92" | 920 m || 
|-id=096 bgcolor=#fefefe
| 202096 ||  || — || October 4, 2004 || Kitt Peak || Spacewatch || V || align=right data-sort-value="0.66" | 660 m || 
|-id=097 bgcolor=#fefefe
| 202097 ||  || — || October 4, 2004 || Kitt Peak || Spacewatch || MAS || align=right data-sort-value="0.94" | 940 m || 
|-id=098 bgcolor=#fefefe
| 202098 ||  || — || October 4, 2004 || Kitt Peak || Spacewatch || NYS || align=right data-sort-value="0.77" | 770 m || 
|-id=099 bgcolor=#fefefe
| 202099 ||  || — || October 4, 2004 || Kitt Peak || Spacewatch || — || align=right | 1.2 km || 
|-id=100 bgcolor=#fefefe
| 202100 ||  || — || October 4, 2004 || Anderson Mesa || LONEOS || KLI || align=right | 2.6 km || 
|}

202101–202200 

|-bgcolor=#fefefe
| 202101 ||  || — || October 4, 2004 || Anderson Mesa || LONEOS || — || align=right | 1.1 km || 
|-id=102 bgcolor=#fefefe
| 202102 ||  || — || October 4, 2004 || Kitt Peak || Spacewatch || MAS || align=right data-sort-value="0.88" | 880 m || 
|-id=103 bgcolor=#fefefe
| 202103 ||  || — || October 4, 2004 || Kitt Peak || Spacewatch || MAS || align=right | 1.1 km || 
|-id=104 bgcolor=#fefefe
| 202104 ||  || — || October 4, 2004 || Kitt Peak || Spacewatch || — || align=right | 1.0 km || 
|-id=105 bgcolor=#fefefe
| 202105 ||  || — || October 4, 2004 || Anderson Mesa || LONEOS || NYS || align=right | 1.2 km || 
|-id=106 bgcolor=#E9E9E9
| 202106 ||  || — || October 4, 2004 || Kitt Peak || Spacewatch || — || align=right | 1.3 km || 
|-id=107 bgcolor=#fefefe
| 202107 ||  || — || October 4, 2004 || Kitt Peak || Spacewatch || MAS || align=right | 1.0 km || 
|-id=108 bgcolor=#fefefe
| 202108 ||  || — || October 4, 2004 || Kitt Peak || Spacewatch || MAS || align=right data-sort-value="0.90" | 900 m || 
|-id=109 bgcolor=#fefefe
| 202109 ||  || — || October 4, 2004 || Kitt Peak || Spacewatch || NYS || align=right data-sort-value="0.97" | 970 m || 
|-id=110 bgcolor=#E9E9E9
| 202110 ||  || — || October 4, 2004 || Kitt Peak || Spacewatch || — || align=right | 1.5 km || 
|-id=111 bgcolor=#fefefe
| 202111 ||  || — || October 5, 2004 || Kitt Peak || Spacewatch || NYS || align=right data-sort-value="0.82" | 820 m || 
|-id=112 bgcolor=#fefefe
| 202112 ||  || — || October 6, 2004 || Kitt Peak || Spacewatch || MAS || align=right | 1.0 km || 
|-id=113 bgcolor=#fefefe
| 202113 ||  || — || October 7, 2004 || Anderson Mesa || LONEOS || — || align=right | 1.3 km || 
|-id=114 bgcolor=#E9E9E9
| 202114 ||  || — || October 7, 2004 || Kitt Peak || Spacewatch || — || align=right | 2.6 km || 
|-id=115 bgcolor=#fefefe
| 202115 ||  || — || October 3, 2004 || Palomar || NEAT || — || align=right | 1.2 km || 
|-id=116 bgcolor=#fefefe
| 202116 ||  || — || October 3, 2004 || Palomar || NEAT || — || align=right | 1.3 km || 
|-id=117 bgcolor=#fefefe
| 202117 ||  || — || October 4, 2004 || Anderson Mesa || LONEOS || — || align=right | 1.3 km || 
|-id=118 bgcolor=#E9E9E9
| 202118 ||  || — || October 5, 2004 || Anderson Mesa || LONEOS || — || align=right | 1.7 km || 
|-id=119 bgcolor=#fefefe
| 202119 ||  || — || October 7, 2004 || Anderson Mesa || LONEOS || — || align=right | 1.7 km || 
|-id=120 bgcolor=#fefefe
| 202120 ||  || — || October 7, 2004 || Anderson Mesa || LONEOS || NYS || align=right data-sort-value="0.76" | 760 m || 
|-id=121 bgcolor=#fefefe
| 202121 ||  || — || October 7, 2004 || Socorro || LINEAR || — || align=right | 1.5 km || 
|-id=122 bgcolor=#fefefe
| 202122 ||  || — || October 7, 2004 || Socorro || LINEAR || — || align=right | 1.5 km || 
|-id=123 bgcolor=#fefefe
| 202123 ||  || — || October 7, 2004 || Anderson Mesa || LONEOS || NYS || align=right | 2.3 km || 
|-id=124 bgcolor=#fefefe
| 202124 ||  || — || October 5, 2004 || Kitt Peak || Spacewatch || — || align=right data-sort-value="0.94" | 940 m || 
|-id=125 bgcolor=#fefefe
| 202125 ||  || — || October 6, 2004 || Kitt Peak || Spacewatch || NYS || align=right data-sort-value="0.78" | 780 m || 
|-id=126 bgcolor=#fefefe
| 202126 ||  || — || October 6, 2004 || Kitt Peak || Spacewatch || — || align=right | 1.1 km || 
|-id=127 bgcolor=#fefefe
| 202127 ||  || — || October 7, 2004 || Socorro || LINEAR || NYS || align=right | 1.2 km || 
|-id=128 bgcolor=#fefefe
| 202128 ||  || — || October 7, 2004 || Socorro || LINEAR || — || align=right | 1.1 km || 
|-id=129 bgcolor=#fefefe
| 202129 ||  || — || October 7, 2004 || Socorro || LINEAR || — || align=right | 1.7 km || 
|-id=130 bgcolor=#E9E9E9
| 202130 ||  || — || October 9, 2004 || Socorro || LINEAR || — || align=right | 1.5 km || 
|-id=131 bgcolor=#fefefe
| 202131 ||  || — || October 7, 2004 || Kitt Peak || Spacewatch || — || align=right | 1.1 km || 
|-id=132 bgcolor=#fefefe
| 202132 ||  || — || October 7, 2004 || Kitt Peak || Spacewatch || NYS || align=right data-sort-value="0.92" | 920 m || 
|-id=133 bgcolor=#E9E9E9
| 202133 ||  || — || October 7, 2004 || Kitt Peak || Spacewatch || HOF || align=right | 3.3 km || 
|-id=134 bgcolor=#fefefe
| 202134 ||  || — || October 7, 2004 || Kitt Peak || Spacewatch || V || align=right | 1.1 km || 
|-id=135 bgcolor=#fefefe
| 202135 ||  || — || October 8, 2004 || Kitt Peak || Spacewatch || — || align=right data-sort-value="0.93" | 930 m || 
|-id=136 bgcolor=#E9E9E9
| 202136 ||  || — || October 8, 2004 || Kitt Peak || Spacewatch || WIT || align=right | 1.6 km || 
|-id=137 bgcolor=#fefefe
| 202137 ||  || — || October 5, 2004 || Kitt Peak || Spacewatch || — || align=right data-sort-value="0.94" | 940 m || 
|-id=138 bgcolor=#fefefe
| 202138 ||  || — || October 7, 2004 || Socorro || LINEAR || KLI || align=right | 3.0 km || 
|-id=139 bgcolor=#E9E9E9
| 202139 ||  || — || October 10, 2004 || Kitt Peak || Spacewatch || — || align=right | 1.2 km || 
|-id=140 bgcolor=#E9E9E9
| 202140 ||  || — || October 7, 2004 || Socorro || LINEAR || — || align=right | 3.2 km || 
|-id=141 bgcolor=#fefefe
| 202141 ||  || — || October 9, 2004 || Kitt Peak || Spacewatch || — || align=right | 2.4 km || 
|-id=142 bgcolor=#E9E9E9
| 202142 ||  || — || October 9, 2004 || Kitt Peak || Spacewatch || AGN || align=right | 1.9 km || 
|-id=143 bgcolor=#E9E9E9
| 202143 ||  || — || October 9, 2004 || Kitt Peak || Spacewatch || — || align=right | 1.1 km || 
|-id=144 bgcolor=#fefefe
| 202144 ||  || — || October 10, 2004 || Kitt Peak || Spacewatch || NYS || align=right | 1.0 km || 
|-id=145 bgcolor=#E9E9E9
| 202145 ||  || — || October 8, 2004 || Kitt Peak || Spacewatch || — || align=right data-sort-value="0.86" | 860 m || 
|-id=146 bgcolor=#E9E9E9
| 202146 ||  || — || October 10, 2004 || Socorro || LINEAR || MAR || align=right | 1.8 km || 
|-id=147 bgcolor=#E9E9E9
| 202147 ||  || — || October 10, 2004 || Palomar || NEAT || — || align=right | 1.7 km || 
|-id=148 bgcolor=#fefefe
| 202148 ||  || — || October 11, 2004 || Kitt Peak || Spacewatch || — || align=right | 1.1 km || 
|-id=149 bgcolor=#fefefe
| 202149 ||  || — || October 11, 2004 || Kitt Peak || Spacewatch || — || align=right | 1.4 km || 
|-id=150 bgcolor=#E9E9E9
| 202150 ||  || — || October 12, 2004 || Kitt Peak || Spacewatch || — || align=right data-sort-value="0.94" | 940 m || 
|-id=151 bgcolor=#fefefe
| 202151 ||  || — || October 12, 2004 || Kitt Peak || Spacewatch || MAS || align=right data-sort-value="0.98" | 980 m || 
|-id=152 bgcolor=#E9E9E9
| 202152 ||  || — || October 14, 2004 || Kitt Peak || Spacewatch || — || align=right | 1.5 km || 
|-id=153 bgcolor=#fefefe
| 202153 ||  || — || October 14, 2004 || Kitt Peak || Spacewatch || NYS || align=right | 1.1 km || 
|-id=154 bgcolor=#E9E9E9
| 202154 ||  || — || October 15, 2004 || Mount Lemmon || Mount Lemmon Survey || MAR || align=right | 1.6 km || 
|-id=155 bgcolor=#E9E9E9
| 202155 ||  || — || October 7, 2004 || Kitt Peak || Spacewatch || — || align=right | 1.7 km || 
|-id=156 bgcolor=#E9E9E9
| 202156 ||  || — || October 21, 2004 || Socorro || LINEAR || MIT || align=right | 2.4 km || 
|-id=157 bgcolor=#fefefe
| 202157 ||  || — || November 3, 2004 || Kitt Peak || Spacewatch || — || align=right | 1.2 km || 
|-id=158 bgcolor=#fefefe
| 202158 ||  || — || November 3, 2004 || Kitt Peak || Spacewatch || MAS || align=right | 1.1 km || 
|-id=159 bgcolor=#fefefe
| 202159 ||  || — || November 3, 2004 || Kitt Peak || Spacewatch || — || align=right | 1.4 km || 
|-id=160 bgcolor=#fefefe
| 202160 ||  || — || November 4, 2004 || Kitt Peak || Spacewatch || — || align=right | 1.3 km || 
|-id=161 bgcolor=#fefefe
| 202161 ||  || — || November 4, 2004 || Catalina || CSS || NYS || align=right | 1.1 km || 
|-id=162 bgcolor=#E9E9E9
| 202162 ||  || — || November 4, 2004 || Catalina || CSS || — || align=right | 1.1 km || 
|-id=163 bgcolor=#fefefe
| 202163 ||  || — || November 3, 2004 || Kitt Peak || Spacewatch || — || align=right | 1.1 km || 
|-id=164 bgcolor=#E9E9E9
| 202164 ||  || — || November 4, 2004 || Kitt Peak || Spacewatch || — || align=right | 1.4 km || 
|-id=165 bgcolor=#E9E9E9
| 202165 ||  || — || November 4, 2004 || Kitt Peak || Spacewatch || WIT || align=right | 1.6 km || 
|-id=166 bgcolor=#E9E9E9
| 202166 ||  || — || November 4, 2004 || Kitt Peak || Spacewatch || — || align=right | 1.8 km || 
|-id=167 bgcolor=#E9E9E9
| 202167 ||  || — || November 9, 2004 || Catalina || CSS || — || align=right | 3.5 km || 
|-id=168 bgcolor=#E9E9E9
| 202168 ||  || — || November 9, 2004 || Catalina || CSS || EUN || align=right | 2.1 km || 
|-id=169 bgcolor=#E9E9E9
| 202169 ||  || — || November 9, 2004 || Catalina || CSS || — || align=right | 4.5 km || 
|-id=170 bgcolor=#E9E9E9
| 202170 ||  || — || November 10, 2004 || Kitt Peak || Spacewatch || — || align=right | 1.2 km || 
|-id=171 bgcolor=#E9E9E9
| 202171 ||  || — || November 7, 2004 || Socorro || LINEAR || — || align=right | 2.0 km || 
|-id=172 bgcolor=#E9E9E9
| 202172 ||  || — || November 11, 2004 || Kitt Peak || Spacewatch || — || align=right | 2.4 km || 
|-id=173 bgcolor=#E9E9E9
| 202173 ||  || — || November 18, 2004 || Jornada || D. S. Dixon || — || align=right | 2.8 km || 
|-id=174 bgcolor=#E9E9E9
| 202174 ||  || — || November 17, 2004 || Siding Spring || SSS || — || align=right | 1.6 km || 
|-id=175 bgcolor=#fefefe
| 202175 ||  || — || December 2, 2004 || Socorro || LINEAR || — || align=right | 2.2 km || 
|-id=176 bgcolor=#E9E9E9
| 202176 ||  || — || December 2, 2004 || Catalina || CSS || — || align=right | 3.6 km || 
|-id=177 bgcolor=#E9E9E9
| 202177 ||  || — || December 2, 2004 || Catalina || CSS || — || align=right | 2.4 km || 
|-id=178 bgcolor=#fefefe
| 202178 ||  || — || December 2, 2004 || Palomar || NEAT || MAS || align=right | 1.2 km || 
|-id=179 bgcolor=#E9E9E9
| 202179 ||  || — || December 7, 2004 || Socorro || LINEAR || MIT || align=right | 3.6 km || 
|-id=180 bgcolor=#E9E9E9
| 202180 ||  || — || December 7, 2004 || Socorro || LINEAR || EUN || align=right | 2.1 km || 
|-id=181 bgcolor=#E9E9E9
| 202181 ||  || — || December 8, 2004 || Socorro || LINEAR || — || align=right | 2.4 km || 
|-id=182 bgcolor=#fefefe
| 202182 ||  || — || December 8, 2004 || Socorro || LINEAR || MAS || align=right | 1.2 km || 
|-id=183 bgcolor=#fefefe
| 202183 ||  || — || December 8, 2004 || Socorro || LINEAR || MAS || align=right | 1.0 km || 
|-id=184 bgcolor=#E9E9E9
| 202184 ||  || — || December 8, 2004 || Socorro || LINEAR || — || align=right | 2.3 km || 
|-id=185 bgcolor=#E9E9E9
| 202185 ||  || — || December 10, 2004 || Socorro || LINEAR || — || align=right | 1.5 km || 
|-id=186 bgcolor=#fefefe
| 202186 ||  || — || December 10, 2004 || Socorro || LINEAR || — || align=right | 3.8 km || 
|-id=187 bgcolor=#E9E9E9
| 202187 ||  || — || December 10, 2004 || Socorro || LINEAR || WAT || align=right | 5.7 km || 
|-id=188 bgcolor=#E9E9E9
| 202188 ||  || — || December 11, 2004 || Socorro || LINEAR || EUN || align=right | 1.9 km || 
|-id=189 bgcolor=#d6d6d6
| 202189 ||  || — || December 11, 2004 || Campo Imperatore || CINEOS || KOR || align=right | 2.1 km || 
|-id=190 bgcolor=#E9E9E9
| 202190 ||  || — || December 9, 2004 || Kitt Peak || Spacewatch || — || align=right | 2.5 km || 
|-id=191 bgcolor=#E9E9E9
| 202191 ||  || — || December 9, 2004 || Kitt Peak || Spacewatch || — || align=right | 2.0 km || 
|-id=192 bgcolor=#E9E9E9
| 202192 ||  || — || December 9, 2004 || Catalina || CSS || — || align=right | 4.4 km || 
|-id=193 bgcolor=#E9E9E9
| 202193 ||  || — || December 10, 2004 || Socorro || LINEAR || — || align=right | 2.1 km || 
|-id=194 bgcolor=#E9E9E9
| 202194 ||  || — || December 10, 2004 || Kitt Peak || Spacewatch || — || align=right | 2.1 km || 
|-id=195 bgcolor=#fefefe
| 202195 ||  || — || December 2, 2004 || Socorro || LINEAR || KLI || align=right | 2.8 km || 
|-id=196 bgcolor=#E9E9E9
| 202196 ||  || — || December 11, 2004 || Haleakala || NEAT || 526 || align=right | 4.5 km || 
|-id=197 bgcolor=#E9E9E9
| 202197 ||  || — || December 11, 2004 || Catalina || CSS || — || align=right | 1.8 km || 
|-id=198 bgcolor=#E9E9E9
| 202198 ||  || — || December 10, 2004 || Socorro || LINEAR || BRU || align=right | 3.3 km || 
|-id=199 bgcolor=#E9E9E9
| 202199 ||  || — || December 10, 2004 || Socorro || LINEAR || — || align=right | 2.0 km || 
|-id=200 bgcolor=#E9E9E9
| 202200 ||  || — || December 10, 2004 || Socorro || LINEAR || NEM || align=right | 4.3 km || 
|}

202201–202300 

|-bgcolor=#E9E9E9
| 202201 ||  || — || December 11, 2004 || Kitt Peak || Spacewatch || — || align=right | 2.7 km || 
|-id=202 bgcolor=#fefefe
| 202202 ||  || — || December 11, 2004 || Kitt Peak || Spacewatch || — || align=right | 1.7 km || 
|-id=203 bgcolor=#fefefe
| 202203 ||  || — || December 13, 2004 || Kitt Peak || Spacewatch || NYS || align=right | 1.1 km || 
|-id=204 bgcolor=#E9E9E9
| 202204 ||  || — || December 10, 2004 || Socorro || LINEAR || — || align=right | 1.7 km || 
|-id=205 bgcolor=#fefefe
| 202205 ||  || — || December 12, 2004 || Kitt Peak || Spacewatch || MAS || align=right | 1.4 km || 
|-id=206 bgcolor=#E9E9E9
| 202206 ||  || — || December 14, 2004 || Socorro || LINEAR || EUN || align=right | 2.5 km || 
|-id=207 bgcolor=#E9E9E9
| 202207 ||  || — || December 9, 2004 || Socorro || LINEAR || — || align=right | 1.6 km || 
|-id=208 bgcolor=#E9E9E9
| 202208 ||  || — || December 14, 2004 || Anderson Mesa || LONEOS || — || align=right | 1.9 km || 
|-id=209 bgcolor=#E9E9E9
| 202209 ||  || — || December 14, 2004 || Catalina || CSS || — || align=right | 3.2 km || 
|-id=210 bgcolor=#E9E9E9
| 202210 ||  || — || December 10, 2004 || Socorro || LINEAR || — || align=right | 2.5 km || 
|-id=211 bgcolor=#E9E9E9
| 202211 ||  || — || December 11, 2004 || Socorro || LINEAR || — || align=right | 2.3 km || 
|-id=212 bgcolor=#E9E9E9
| 202212 ||  || — || December 12, 2004 || Kitt Peak || Spacewatch || — || align=right | 2.0 km || 
|-id=213 bgcolor=#E9E9E9
| 202213 ||  || — || December 15, 2004 || Bergisch Gladbach || W. Bickel || — || align=right | 1.8 km || 
|-id=214 bgcolor=#fefefe
| 202214 ||  || — || December 10, 2004 || Kitt Peak || Spacewatch || MAS || align=right | 1.0 km || 
|-id=215 bgcolor=#E9E9E9
| 202215 ||  || — || December 10, 2004 || Kitt Peak || Spacewatch || — || align=right | 1.5 km || 
|-id=216 bgcolor=#fefefe
| 202216 ||  || — || December 11, 2004 || Socorro || LINEAR || — || align=right | 1.4 km || 
|-id=217 bgcolor=#E9E9E9
| 202217 ||  || — || December 11, 2004 || Catalina || CSS || — || align=right | 2.3 km || 
|-id=218 bgcolor=#E9E9E9
| 202218 ||  || — || December 14, 2004 || Socorro || LINEAR || — || align=right | 2.3 km || 
|-id=219 bgcolor=#d6d6d6
| 202219 ||  || — || December 15, 2004 || Socorro || LINEAR || — || align=right | 5.3 km || 
|-id=220 bgcolor=#E9E9E9
| 202220 ||  || — || December 14, 2004 || Catalina || CSS || — || align=right | 2.7 km || 
|-id=221 bgcolor=#E9E9E9
| 202221 ||  || — || December 15, 2004 || Socorro || LINEAR || ADE || align=right | 3.7 km || 
|-id=222 bgcolor=#E9E9E9
| 202222 ||  || — || December 14, 2004 || Socorro || LINEAR || — || align=right | 4.3 km || 
|-id=223 bgcolor=#E9E9E9
| 202223 ||  || — || December 11, 2004 || Kitt Peak || Spacewatch || — || align=right | 3.2 km || 
|-id=224 bgcolor=#E9E9E9
| 202224 ||  || — || December 14, 2004 || Socorro || LINEAR || — || align=right | 1.7 km || 
|-id=225 bgcolor=#E9E9E9
| 202225 ||  || — || December 2, 2004 || Catalina || CSS || — || align=right | 2.8 km || 
|-id=226 bgcolor=#d6d6d6
| 202226 ||  || — || December 13, 2004 || Kitt Peak || Spacewatch || — || align=right | 4.6 km || 
|-id=227 bgcolor=#E9E9E9
| 202227 ||  || — || December 16, 2004 || Uccle || T. Pauwels || — || align=right | 2.1 km || 
|-id=228 bgcolor=#E9E9E9
| 202228 ||  || — || December 17, 2004 || Socorro || LINEAR || — || align=right | 3.1 km || 
|-id=229 bgcolor=#E9E9E9
| 202229 ||  || — || December 19, 2004 || Socorro || LINEAR || GAL || align=right | 2.5 km || 
|-id=230 bgcolor=#E9E9E9
| 202230 ||  || — || December 18, 2004 || Mount Lemmon || Mount Lemmon Survey || — || align=right | 3.6 km || 
|-id=231 bgcolor=#fefefe
| 202231 ||  || — || December 18, 2004 || Mount Lemmon || Mount Lemmon Survey || V || align=right | 1.1 km || 
|-id=232 bgcolor=#fefefe
| 202232 ||  || — || December 18, 2004 || Mount Lemmon || Mount Lemmon Survey || — || align=right | 1.8 km || 
|-id=233 bgcolor=#E9E9E9
| 202233 ||  || — || December 18, 2004 || Mount Lemmon || Mount Lemmon Survey || AGN || align=right | 1.9 km || 
|-id=234 bgcolor=#E9E9E9
| 202234 ||  || — || December 19, 2004 || Mount Lemmon || Mount Lemmon Survey || HEN || align=right | 1.6 km || 
|-id=235 bgcolor=#fefefe
| 202235 ||  || — || December 16, 2004 || Kitt Peak || Spacewatch || NYS || align=right data-sort-value="0.97" | 970 m || 
|-id=236 bgcolor=#E9E9E9
| 202236 ||  || — || December 18, 2004 || Socorro || LINEAR || BRU || align=right | 5.6 km || 
|-id=237 bgcolor=#E9E9E9
| 202237 ||  || — || December 19, 2004 || Catalina || CSS || — || align=right | 1.9 km || 
|-id=238 bgcolor=#E9E9E9
| 202238 ||  || — || January 1, 2005 || Catalina || CSS || — || align=right | 1.4 km || 
|-id=239 bgcolor=#E9E9E9
| 202239 ||  || — || January 6, 2005 || Socorro || LINEAR || — || align=right | 4.1 km || 
|-id=240 bgcolor=#fefefe
| 202240 ||  || — || January 6, 2005 || Socorro || LINEAR || — || align=right | 1.5 km || 
|-id=241 bgcolor=#E9E9E9
| 202241 ||  || — || January 6, 2005 || Catalina || CSS || — || align=right | 4.5 km || 
|-id=242 bgcolor=#E9E9E9
| 202242 ||  || — || January 1, 2005 || Catalina || CSS || — || align=right | 2.2 km || 
|-id=243 bgcolor=#E9E9E9
| 202243 ||  || — || January 7, 2005 || Socorro || LINEAR || — || align=right | 1.9 km || 
|-id=244 bgcolor=#E9E9E9
| 202244 ||  || — || January 7, 2005 || Socorro || LINEAR || fast? || align=right | 1.6 km || 
|-id=245 bgcolor=#E9E9E9
| 202245 ||  || — || January 7, 2005 || Socorro || LINEAR || — || align=right | 1.5 km || 
|-id=246 bgcolor=#d6d6d6
| 202246 ||  || — || January 7, 2005 || Catalina || CSS || — || align=right | 2.4 km || 
|-id=247 bgcolor=#E9E9E9
| 202247 ||  || — || January 6, 2005 || Socorro || LINEAR || — || align=right | 3.0 km || 
|-id=248 bgcolor=#E9E9E9
| 202248 ||  || — || January 6, 2005 || Socorro || LINEAR || MIT || align=right | 4.4 km || 
|-id=249 bgcolor=#E9E9E9
| 202249 ||  || — || January 6, 2005 || Socorro || LINEAR || — || align=right | 2.0 km || 
|-id=250 bgcolor=#E9E9E9
| 202250 ||  || — || January 6, 2005 || Socorro || LINEAR || — || align=right | 3.0 km || 
|-id=251 bgcolor=#E9E9E9
| 202251 ||  || — || January 6, 2005 || Catalina || CSS || — || align=right | 2.2 km || 
|-id=252 bgcolor=#E9E9E9
| 202252 ||  || — || January 7, 2005 || Socorro || LINEAR || — || align=right | 1.7 km || 
|-id=253 bgcolor=#fefefe
| 202253 ||  || — || January 11, 2005 || Socorro || LINEAR || — || align=right | 1.4 km || 
|-id=254 bgcolor=#d6d6d6
| 202254 ||  || — || January 13, 2005 || Catalina || CSS || — || align=right | 4.9 km || 
|-id=255 bgcolor=#E9E9E9
| 202255 ||  || — || January 9, 2005 || Catalina || CSS || — || align=right | 3.4 km || 
|-id=256 bgcolor=#fefefe
| 202256 ||  || — || January 11, 2005 || Socorro || LINEAR || — || align=right | 1.4 km || 
|-id=257 bgcolor=#fefefe
| 202257 ||  || — || January 11, 2005 || Socorro || LINEAR || — || align=right | 1.6 km || 
|-id=258 bgcolor=#E9E9E9
| 202258 ||  || — || January 13, 2005 || Kitt Peak || Spacewatch || — || align=right | 2.3 km || 
|-id=259 bgcolor=#E9E9E9
| 202259 ||  || — || January 15, 2005 || Catalina || CSS || EUN || align=right | 2.1 km || 
|-id=260 bgcolor=#E9E9E9
| 202260 ||  || — || January 15, 2005 || Catalina || CSS || — || align=right | 3.1 km || 
|-id=261 bgcolor=#E9E9E9
| 202261 ||  || — || January 15, 2005 || Kvistaberg || UDAS || — || align=right | 1.8 km || 
|-id=262 bgcolor=#fefefe
| 202262 ||  || — || January 15, 2005 || Socorro || LINEAR || — || align=right | 1.2 km || 
|-id=263 bgcolor=#E9E9E9
| 202263 ||  || — || January 15, 2005 || Kitt Peak || Spacewatch || NEM || align=right | 3.5 km || 
|-id=264 bgcolor=#E9E9E9
| 202264 ||  || — || January 15, 2005 || Kitt Peak || Spacewatch || — || align=right | 4.1 km || 
|-id=265 bgcolor=#d6d6d6
| 202265 ||  || — || January 13, 2005 || Kitt Peak || Spacewatch || KOR || align=right | 2.1 km || 
|-id=266 bgcolor=#d6d6d6
| 202266 ||  || — || January 15, 2005 || Socorro || LINEAR || K-2 || align=right | 2.1 km || 
|-id=267 bgcolor=#E9E9E9
| 202267 ||  || — || January 15, 2005 || Kitt Peak || Spacewatch || — || align=right | 2.2 km || 
|-id=268 bgcolor=#E9E9E9
| 202268 ||  || — || January 15, 2005 || Kitt Peak || Spacewatch || — || align=right | 1.8 km || 
|-id=269 bgcolor=#d6d6d6
| 202269 ||  || — || January 15, 2005 || Kitt Peak || Spacewatch || KOR || align=right | 1.4 km || 
|-id=270 bgcolor=#d6d6d6
| 202270 ||  || — || January 15, 2005 || Kitt Peak || Spacewatch || — || align=right | 3.4 km || 
|-id=271 bgcolor=#E9E9E9
| 202271 ||  || — || January 7, 2005 || Socorro || LINEAR || — || align=right | 4.5 km || 
|-id=272 bgcolor=#E9E9E9
| 202272 ||  || — || January 16, 2005 || Kitt Peak || Spacewatch || — || align=right | 5.5 km || 
|-id=273 bgcolor=#fefefe
| 202273 ||  || — || January 16, 2005 || Socorro || LINEAR || — || align=right | 1.4 km || 
|-id=274 bgcolor=#E9E9E9
| 202274 ||  || — || January 16, 2005 || Kitt Peak || Spacewatch || WIT || align=right | 1.4 km || 
|-id=275 bgcolor=#E9E9E9
| 202275 ||  || — || January 16, 2005 || Socorro || LINEAR || MRX || align=right | 1.5 km || 
|-id=276 bgcolor=#d6d6d6
| 202276 ||  || — || January 16, 2005 || Kitt Peak || Spacewatch || — || align=right | 3.5 km || 
|-id=277 bgcolor=#E9E9E9
| 202277 ||  || — || January 16, 2005 || Kitt Peak || Spacewatch || — || align=right | 1.5 km || 
|-id=278 bgcolor=#E9E9E9
| 202278 ||  || — || January 16, 2005 || Kitt Peak || Spacewatch || PAD || align=right | 2.2 km || 
|-id=279 bgcolor=#E9E9E9
| 202279 ||  || — || January 17, 2005 || Kitt Peak || Spacewatch || NEM || align=right | 2.4 km || 
|-id=280 bgcolor=#E9E9E9
| 202280 ||  || — || January 18, 2005 || Catalina || CSS || — || align=right | 2.4 km || 
|-id=281 bgcolor=#d6d6d6
| 202281 ||  || — || January 18, 2005 || Catalina || CSS || CHA || align=right | 3.5 km || 
|-id=282 bgcolor=#d6d6d6
| 202282 ||  || — || January 18, 2005 || Catalina || CSS || — || align=right | 4.4 km || 
|-id=283 bgcolor=#E9E9E9
| 202283 ||  || — || January 18, 2005 || Kitt Peak || Spacewatch || PAD || align=right | 2.6 km || 
|-id=284 bgcolor=#d6d6d6
| 202284 ||  || — || January 16, 2005 || Mauna Kea || C. Veillet || — || align=right | 3.5 km || 
|-id=285 bgcolor=#E9E9E9
| 202285 ||  || — || January 16, 2005 || Mauna Kea || C. Veillet || — || align=right | 2.3 km || 
|-id=286 bgcolor=#d6d6d6
| 202286 ||  || — || January 16, 2005 || Mauna Kea || C. Veillet || — || align=right | 3.8 km || 
|-id=287 bgcolor=#d6d6d6
| 202287 ||  || — || January 18, 2005 || Catalina || CSS || — || align=right | 3.9 km || 
|-id=288 bgcolor=#E9E9E9
| 202288 ||  || — || February 1, 2005 || Kitt Peak || Spacewatch || HEN || align=right | 1.8 km || 
|-id=289 bgcolor=#E9E9E9
| 202289 ||  || — || February 2, 2005 || Socorro || LINEAR || — || align=right | 1.6 km || 
|-id=290 bgcolor=#E9E9E9
| 202290 ||  || — || February 2, 2005 || Catalina || CSS || EUN || align=right | 1.8 km || 
|-id=291 bgcolor=#E9E9E9
| 202291 ||  || — || February 1, 2005 || Catalina || CSS || — || align=right | 1.7 km || 
|-id=292 bgcolor=#E9E9E9
| 202292 ||  || — || February 4, 2005 || Catalina || CSS || — || align=right | 2.9 km || 
|-id=293 bgcolor=#E9E9E9
| 202293 ||  || — || February 2, 2005 || Catalina || CSS || — || align=right | 2.5 km || 
|-id=294 bgcolor=#E9E9E9
| 202294 ||  || — || February 1, 2005 || Kitt Peak || Spacewatch || — || align=right | 2.3 km || 
|-id=295 bgcolor=#E9E9E9
| 202295 ||  || — || February 9, 2005 || La Silla || A. Boattini, H. Scholl || — || align=right | 2.3 km || 
|-id=296 bgcolor=#d6d6d6
| 202296 ||  || — || February 10, 2005 || Powell || R. Fredrick, R. Trentman || — || align=right | 3.7 km || 
|-id=297 bgcolor=#E9E9E9
| 202297 ||  || — || February 2, 2005 || Catalina || CSS || — || align=right | 2.2 km || 
|-id=298 bgcolor=#E9E9E9
| 202298 ||  || — || February 2, 2005 || Kitt Peak || Spacewatch || — || align=right | 1.6 km || 
|-id=299 bgcolor=#E9E9E9
| 202299 ||  || — || February 2, 2005 || Catalina || CSS || — || align=right | 3.8 km || 
|-id=300 bgcolor=#d6d6d6
| 202300 ||  || — || February 3, 2005 || Socorro || LINEAR || — || align=right | 2.8 km || 
|}

202301–202400 

|-bgcolor=#E9E9E9
| 202301 ||  || — || February 3, 2005 || Socorro || LINEAR || — || align=right | 3.3 km || 
|-id=302 bgcolor=#d6d6d6
| 202302 ||  || — || February 3, 2005 || Calvin-Rehoboth || Calvin–Rehoboth Obs. || — || align=right | 3.3 km || 
|-id=303 bgcolor=#d6d6d6
| 202303 ||  || — || February 9, 2005 || Anderson Mesa || LONEOS || BRA || align=right | 2.3 km || 
|-id=304 bgcolor=#d6d6d6
| 202304 ||  || — || February 1, 2005 || Kitt Peak || Spacewatch || KOR || align=right | 1.5 km || 
|-id=305 bgcolor=#E9E9E9
| 202305 ||  || — || February 2, 2005 || Socorro || LINEAR || DOR || align=right | 4.2 km || 
|-id=306 bgcolor=#d6d6d6
| 202306 ||  || — || February 1, 2005 || Kitt Peak || Spacewatch || — || align=right | 4.7 km || 
|-id=307 bgcolor=#d6d6d6
| 202307 || 2005 DQ || — || February 28, 2005 || Junk Bond || Junk Bond Obs. || — || align=right | 5.7 km || 
|-id=308 bgcolor=#d6d6d6
| 202308 ||  || — || February 18, 2005 || La Silla || A. Boattini, H. Scholl || — || align=right | 2.9 km || 
|-id=309 bgcolor=#d6d6d6
| 202309 ||  || — || March 1, 2005 || Kitt Peak || Spacewatch || — || align=right | 4.3 km || 
|-id=310 bgcolor=#E9E9E9
| 202310 ||  || — || March 2, 2005 || Catalina || CSS || HEN || align=right | 1.7 km || 
|-id=311 bgcolor=#d6d6d6
| 202311 ||  || — || March 2, 2005 || Catalina || CSS || — || align=right | 4.5 km || 
|-id=312 bgcolor=#d6d6d6
| 202312 ||  || — || March 2, 2005 || Catalina || CSS || — || align=right | 5.8 km || 
|-id=313 bgcolor=#d6d6d6
| 202313 ||  || — || March 3, 2005 || Kitt Peak || Spacewatch || — || align=right | 4.4 km || 
|-id=314 bgcolor=#d6d6d6
| 202314 ||  || — || March 3, 2005 || Catalina || CSS || HIL3:2 || align=right | 9.7 km || 
|-id=315 bgcolor=#E9E9E9
| 202315 ||  || — || March 3, 2005 || Catalina || CSS || — || align=right | 3.1 km || 
|-id=316 bgcolor=#d6d6d6
| 202316 ||  || — || March 3, 2005 || Catalina || CSS || EOS || align=right | 3.7 km || 
|-id=317 bgcolor=#E9E9E9
| 202317 ||  || — || March 3, 2005 || Kitt Peak || Spacewatch || — || align=right | 3.4 km || 
|-id=318 bgcolor=#d6d6d6
| 202318 ||  || — || March 3, 2005 || Catalina || CSS || THM || align=right | 2.9 km || 
|-id=319 bgcolor=#d6d6d6
| 202319 ||  || — || March 3, 2005 || Kitt Peak || Spacewatch || VER || align=right | 4.2 km || 
|-id=320 bgcolor=#E9E9E9
| 202320 ||  || — || March 3, 2005 || Catalina || CSS || — || align=right | 3.0 km || 
|-id=321 bgcolor=#d6d6d6
| 202321 ||  || — || March 4, 2005 || Kitt Peak || Spacewatch || EOS || align=right | 2.5 km || 
|-id=322 bgcolor=#d6d6d6
| 202322 ||  || — || March 4, 2005 || Kitt Peak || Spacewatch || HYG || align=right | 4.1 km || 
|-id=323 bgcolor=#d6d6d6
| 202323 ||  || — || March 4, 2005 || Catalina || CSS || — || align=right | 3.2 km || 
|-id=324 bgcolor=#d6d6d6
| 202324 ||  || — || March 7, 2005 || Socorro || LINEAR || — || align=right | 4.4 km || 
|-id=325 bgcolor=#E9E9E9
| 202325 ||  || — || March 3, 2005 || Catalina || CSS || MIS || align=right | 3.8 km || 
|-id=326 bgcolor=#E9E9E9
| 202326 ||  || — || March 3, 2005 || Catalina || CSS || — || align=right | 2.5 km || 
|-id=327 bgcolor=#d6d6d6
| 202327 ||  || — || March 3, 2005 || Kitt Peak || Spacewatch || — || align=right | 3.1 km || 
|-id=328 bgcolor=#d6d6d6
| 202328 ||  || — || March 3, 2005 || Kitt Peak || Spacewatch || HYG || align=right | 3.6 km || 
|-id=329 bgcolor=#d6d6d6
| 202329 ||  || — || March 3, 2005 || Kitt Peak || Spacewatch || — || align=right | 3.8 km || 
|-id=330 bgcolor=#E9E9E9
| 202330 ||  || — || March 4, 2005 || Socorro || LINEAR || — || align=right | 1.5 km || 
|-id=331 bgcolor=#d6d6d6
| 202331 ||  || — || March 8, 2005 || Kitt Peak || Spacewatch || — || align=right | 4.9 km || 
|-id=332 bgcolor=#E9E9E9
| 202332 ||  || — || March 8, 2005 || Kitt Peak || Spacewatch || — || align=right | 3.3 km || 
|-id=333 bgcolor=#E9E9E9
| 202333 ||  || — || March 8, 2005 || Socorro || LINEAR || — || align=right | 3.1 km || 
|-id=334 bgcolor=#E9E9E9
| 202334 ||  || — || March 3, 2005 || Catalina || CSS || — || align=right | 2.7 km || 
|-id=335 bgcolor=#d6d6d6
| 202335 ||  || — || March 3, 2005 || Catalina || CSS || — || align=right | 3.2 km || 
|-id=336 bgcolor=#d6d6d6
| 202336 ||  || — || March 4, 2005 || Mount Lemmon || Mount Lemmon Survey || THM || align=right | 4.0 km || 
|-id=337 bgcolor=#d6d6d6
| 202337 ||  || — || March 4, 2005 || Catalina || CSS || — || align=right | 4.8 km || 
|-id=338 bgcolor=#d6d6d6
| 202338 ||  || — || March 4, 2005 || Mount Lemmon || Mount Lemmon Survey || — || align=right | 2.9 km || 
|-id=339 bgcolor=#d6d6d6
| 202339 ||  || — || March 4, 2005 || Socorro || LINEAR || ELF || align=right | 5.6 km || 
|-id=340 bgcolor=#d6d6d6
| 202340 ||  || — || March 7, 2005 || Socorro || LINEAR || EOS || align=right | 3.6 km || 
|-id=341 bgcolor=#E9E9E9
| 202341 ||  || — || March 8, 2005 || Mount Lemmon || Mount Lemmon Survey || AGN || align=right | 1.6 km || 
|-id=342 bgcolor=#d6d6d6
| 202342 ||  || — || March 8, 2005 || Mount Lemmon || Mount Lemmon Survey || EOS || align=right | 3.6 km || 
|-id=343 bgcolor=#d6d6d6
| 202343 ||  || — || March 9, 2005 || Catalina || CSS || EOS || align=right | 2.7 km || 
|-id=344 bgcolor=#d6d6d6
| 202344 ||  || — || March 9, 2005 || Mount Lemmon || Mount Lemmon Survey || KOR || align=right | 1.7 km || 
|-id=345 bgcolor=#d6d6d6
| 202345 ||  || — || March 10, 2005 || Mount Lemmon || Mount Lemmon Survey || — || align=right | 3.2 km || 
|-id=346 bgcolor=#d6d6d6
| 202346 ||  || — || March 8, 2005 || Catalina || CSS || — || align=right | 5.7 km || 
|-id=347 bgcolor=#d6d6d6
| 202347 ||  || — || March 11, 2005 || Mount Lemmon || Mount Lemmon Survey || — || align=right | 3.9 km || 
|-id=348 bgcolor=#E9E9E9
| 202348 ||  || — || March 7, 2005 || Socorro || LINEAR || EUN || align=right | 2.3 km || 
|-id=349 bgcolor=#d6d6d6
| 202349 ||  || — || March 8, 2005 || Anderson Mesa || LONEOS || TRP || align=right | 3.9 km || 
|-id=350 bgcolor=#d6d6d6
| 202350 ||  || — || March 8, 2005 || Kitt Peak || Spacewatch || — || align=right | 4.6 km || 
|-id=351 bgcolor=#d6d6d6
| 202351 ||  || — || March 8, 2005 || Kitt Peak || Spacewatch || — || align=right | 4.2 km || 
|-id=352 bgcolor=#d6d6d6
| 202352 ||  || — || March 9, 2005 || Socorro || LINEAR || — || align=right | 4.1 km || 
|-id=353 bgcolor=#d6d6d6
| 202353 ||  || — || March 10, 2005 || Siding Spring || SSS || — || align=right | 6.7 km || 
|-id=354 bgcolor=#d6d6d6
| 202354 ||  || — || March 11, 2005 || Mount Lemmon || Mount Lemmon Survey || — || align=right | 4.7 km || 
|-id=355 bgcolor=#E9E9E9
| 202355 ||  || — || March 8, 2005 || Catalina || CSS || — || align=right | 2.0 km || 
|-id=356 bgcolor=#d6d6d6
| 202356 ||  || — || March 7, 2005 || Goodricke-Pigott || R. A. Tucker || — || align=right | 3.0 km || 
|-id=357 bgcolor=#d6d6d6
| 202357 ||  || — || March 8, 2005 || Anderson Mesa || LONEOS || — || align=right | 5.2 km || 
|-id=358 bgcolor=#d6d6d6
| 202358 ||  || — || March 9, 2005 || Socorro || LINEAR || — || align=right | 5.0 km || 
|-id=359 bgcolor=#E9E9E9
| 202359 ||  || — || March 9, 2005 || Socorro || LINEAR || — || align=right | 3.9 km || 
|-id=360 bgcolor=#d6d6d6
| 202360 ||  || — || March 11, 2005 || Kitt Peak || Spacewatch || THM || align=right | 3.6 km || 
|-id=361 bgcolor=#d6d6d6
| 202361 ||  || — || March 9, 2005 || Catalina || CSS || EOS || align=right | 3.5 km || 
|-id=362 bgcolor=#d6d6d6
| 202362 ||  || — || March 11, 2005 || Catalina || CSS || EOS || align=right | 3.2 km || 
|-id=363 bgcolor=#d6d6d6
| 202363 ||  || — || March 12, 2005 || Kitt Peak || Spacewatch || — || align=right | 3.8 km || 
|-id=364 bgcolor=#d6d6d6
| 202364 ||  || — || March 11, 2005 || Mount Lemmon || Mount Lemmon Survey || — || align=right | 3.8 km || 
|-id=365 bgcolor=#d6d6d6
| 202365 ||  || — || March 11, 2005 || Socorro || LINEAR || EOS || align=right | 3.2 km || 
|-id=366 bgcolor=#d6d6d6
| 202366 ||  || — || March 12, 2005 || Socorro || LINEAR || — || align=right | 4.0 km || 
|-id=367 bgcolor=#d6d6d6
| 202367 ||  || — || March 3, 2005 || Catalina || CSS || — || align=right | 4.7 km || 
|-id=368 bgcolor=#d6d6d6
| 202368 ||  || — || March 8, 2005 || Socorro || LINEAR || HYG || align=right | 6.1 km || 
|-id=369 bgcolor=#d6d6d6
| 202369 ||  || — || March 8, 2005 || Mount Lemmon || Mount Lemmon Survey || — || align=right | 3.7 km || 
|-id=370 bgcolor=#d6d6d6
| 202370 ||  || — || March 9, 2005 || Socorro || LINEAR || — || align=right | 5.7 km || 
|-id=371 bgcolor=#d6d6d6
| 202371 ||  || — || March 10, 2005 || Catalina || CSS || — || align=right | 5.2 km || 
|-id=372 bgcolor=#d6d6d6
| 202372 ||  || — || March 10, 2005 || Mount Lemmon || Mount Lemmon Survey || — || align=right | 4.7 km || 
|-id=373 bgcolor=#d6d6d6
| 202373 Ubuntu ||  ||  || March 11, 2005 || Kitt Peak || A. Gulbis || — || align=right | 3.2 km || 
|-id=374 bgcolor=#E9E9E9
| 202374 ||  || — || March 10, 2005 || Catalina || CSS || — || align=right | 2.5 km || 
|-id=375 bgcolor=#d6d6d6
| 202375 ||  || — || March 17, 2005 || Mount Lemmon || Mount Lemmon Survey || ANF || align=right | 2.2 km || 
|-id=376 bgcolor=#d6d6d6
| 202376 ||  || — || April 1, 2005 || Anderson Mesa || LONEOS || — || align=right | 6.3 km || 
|-id=377 bgcolor=#d6d6d6
| 202377 ||  || — || April 2, 2005 || Mount Lemmon || Mount Lemmon Survey || — || align=right | 3.2 km || 
|-id=378 bgcolor=#E9E9E9
| 202378 ||  || — || April 3, 2005 || Palomar || NEAT || — || align=right | 2.8 km || 
|-id=379 bgcolor=#d6d6d6
| 202379 ||  || — || April 4, 2005 || Mount Lemmon || Mount Lemmon Survey || — || align=right | 3.2 km || 
|-id=380 bgcolor=#d6d6d6
| 202380 ||  || — || April 4, 2005 || Socorro || LINEAR || — || align=right | 3.7 km || 
|-id=381 bgcolor=#d6d6d6
| 202381 ||  || — || April 1, 2005 || Kitt Peak || Spacewatch || — || align=right | 5.5 km || 
|-id=382 bgcolor=#d6d6d6
| 202382 ||  || — || April 5, 2005 || Palomar || NEAT || — || align=right | 6.1 km || 
|-id=383 bgcolor=#d6d6d6
| 202383 ||  || — || April 6, 2005 || Mount Lemmon || Mount Lemmon Survey || — || align=right | 3.2 km || 
|-id=384 bgcolor=#d6d6d6
| 202384 ||  || — || April 2, 2005 || Mount Lemmon || Mount Lemmon Survey || THM || align=right | 3.0 km || 
|-id=385 bgcolor=#d6d6d6
| 202385 ||  || — || April 2, 2005 || Catalina || CSS || VER || align=right | 5.0 km || 
|-id=386 bgcolor=#E9E9E9
| 202386 ||  || — || April 2, 2005 || Kitt Peak || Spacewatch || — || align=right | 2.4 km || 
|-id=387 bgcolor=#d6d6d6
| 202387 ||  || — || April 5, 2005 || Mount Lemmon || Mount Lemmon Survey || — || align=right | 3.7 km || 
|-id=388 bgcolor=#d6d6d6
| 202388 ||  || — || April 5, 2005 || Mount Lemmon || Mount Lemmon Survey || — || align=right | 3.4 km || 
|-id=389 bgcolor=#d6d6d6
| 202389 ||  || — || April 4, 2005 || Catalina || CSS || — || align=right | 3.4 km || 
|-id=390 bgcolor=#d6d6d6
| 202390 ||  || — || April 4, 2005 || Catalina || CSS || — || align=right | 3.9 km || 
|-id=391 bgcolor=#d6d6d6
| 202391 ||  || — || April 10, 2005 || Kitt Peak || Spacewatch || — || align=right | 4.5 km || 
|-id=392 bgcolor=#d6d6d6
| 202392 ||  || — || April 12, 2005 || Kitt Peak || Spacewatch || MEL || align=right | 4.4 km || 
|-id=393 bgcolor=#d6d6d6
| 202393 ||  || — || April 13, 2005 || Anderson Mesa || LONEOS || — || align=right | 2.4 km || 
|-id=394 bgcolor=#d6d6d6
| 202394 ||  || — || April 14, 2005 || Kitt Peak || Spacewatch || — || align=right | 5.4 km || 
|-id=395 bgcolor=#d6d6d6
| 202395 ||  || — || April 12, 2005 || Kitt Peak || Spacewatch || — || align=right | 4.5 km || 
|-id=396 bgcolor=#d6d6d6
| 202396 ||  || — || April 30, 2005 || Kitt Peak || Spacewatch || — || align=right | 5.3 km || 
|-id=397 bgcolor=#d6d6d6
| 202397 ||  || — || May 4, 2005 || Mount Lemmon || Mount Lemmon Survey || THM || align=right | 2.9 km || 
|-id=398 bgcolor=#fefefe
| 202398 ||  || — || May 4, 2005 || Mount Lemmon || Mount Lemmon Survey || — || align=right data-sort-value="0.83" | 830 m || 
|-id=399 bgcolor=#E9E9E9
| 202399 ||  || — || May 4, 2005 || Kitt Peak || Spacewatch || MIS || align=right | 3.9 km || 
|-id=400 bgcolor=#d6d6d6
| 202400 ||  || — || May 4, 2005 || Siding Spring || SSS || — || align=right | 6.9 km || 
|}

202401–202500 

|-bgcolor=#d6d6d6
| 202401 ||  || — || May 7, 2005 || Kitt Peak || Spacewatch || — || align=right | 6.4 km || 
|-id=402 bgcolor=#d6d6d6
| 202402 ||  || — || May 10, 2005 || Bergisch Gladbach || W. Bickel || — || align=right | 5.0 km || 
|-id=403 bgcolor=#fefefe
| 202403 ||  || — || May 13, 2005 || Mount Lemmon || Mount Lemmon Survey || NYS || align=right data-sort-value="0.91" | 910 m || 
|-id=404 bgcolor=#d6d6d6
| 202404 ||  || — || May 16, 2005 || Kitt Peak || Spacewatch || LIX || align=right | 4.4 km || 
|-id=405 bgcolor=#d6d6d6
| 202405 ||  || — || June 1, 2005 || Kitt Peak || Spacewatch || HYG || align=right | 4.0 km || 
|-id=406 bgcolor=#d6d6d6
| 202406 ||  || — || June 5, 2005 || Kitt Peak || Spacewatch || EOS || align=right | 2.6 km || 
|-id=407 bgcolor=#d6d6d6
| 202407 ||  || — || June 8, 2005 || Kitt Peak || Spacewatch || — || align=right | 2.9 km || 
|-id=408 bgcolor=#d6d6d6
| 202408 ||  || — || June 13, 2005 || Kitt Peak || Spacewatch || ALA || align=right | 7.3 km || 
|-id=409 bgcolor=#FA8072
| 202409 ||  || — || June 24, 2005 || Palomar || NEAT || H || align=right | 1.3 km || 
|-id=410 bgcolor=#E9E9E9
| 202410 ||  || — || July 5, 2005 || Kitt Peak || Spacewatch || — || align=right | 1.1 km || 
|-id=411 bgcolor=#FFC2E0
| 202411 || 2005 RC || — || September 1, 2005 || Socorro || LINEAR || APO +1km || align=right | 1.1 km || 
|-id=412 bgcolor=#fefefe
| 202412 ||  || — || September 30, 2005 || Palomar || NEAT || — || align=right | 1.0 km || 
|-id=413 bgcolor=#fefefe
| 202413 ||  || — || October 1, 2005 || Mount Lemmon || Mount Lemmon Survey || — || align=right | 1.3 km || 
|-id=414 bgcolor=#fefefe
| 202414 ||  || — || October 22, 2005 || Kitt Peak || Spacewatch || — || align=right data-sort-value="0.99" | 990 m || 
|-id=415 bgcolor=#d6d6d6
| 202415 ||  || — || October 23, 2005 || Kitt Peak || Spacewatch || — || align=right | 3.1 km || 
|-id=416 bgcolor=#fefefe
| 202416 ||  || — || October 22, 2005 || Kitt Peak || Spacewatch || — || align=right data-sort-value="0.91" | 910 m || 
|-id=417 bgcolor=#fefefe
| 202417 ||  || — || October 24, 2005 || Kitt Peak || Spacewatch || — || align=right | 1.0 km || 
|-id=418 bgcolor=#fefefe
| 202418 ||  || — || October 24, 2005 || Kitt Peak || Spacewatch || FLO || align=right data-sort-value="0.67" | 670 m || 
|-id=419 bgcolor=#fefefe
| 202419 ||  || — || October 23, 2005 || Catalina || CSS || — || align=right | 1.1 km || 
|-id=420 bgcolor=#E9E9E9
| 202420 ||  || — || October 24, 2005 || Mauna Kea || D. J. Tholen || — || align=right | 1.8 km || 
|-id=421 bgcolor=#C2E0FF
| 202421 ||  || — || October 21, 2005 || Palomar || Palomar Obs. || other TNO || align=right | 715 km || 
|-id=422 bgcolor=#fefefe
| 202422 ||  || — || November 3, 2005 || Mount Lemmon || Mount Lemmon Survey || — || align=right | 1.3 km || 
|-id=423 bgcolor=#fefefe
| 202423 ||  || — || November 3, 2005 || Socorro || LINEAR || H || align=right data-sort-value="0.99" | 990 m || 
|-id=424 bgcolor=#fefefe
| 202424 ||  || — || November 25, 2005 || Mount Lemmon || Mount Lemmon Survey || — || align=right data-sort-value="0.74" | 740 m || 
|-id=425 bgcolor=#fefefe
| 202425 ||  || — || November 30, 2005 || Socorro || LINEAR || — || align=right | 1.1 km || 
|-id=426 bgcolor=#fefefe
| 202426 ||  || — || November 28, 2005 || Kitt Peak || Spacewatch || FLO || align=right data-sort-value="0.92" | 920 m || 
|-id=427 bgcolor=#fefefe
| 202427 ||  || — || November 30, 2005 || Kitt Peak || Spacewatch || FLO || align=right data-sort-value="0.80" | 800 m || 
|-id=428 bgcolor=#fefefe
| 202428 ||  || — || November 30, 2005 || Kitt Peak || Spacewatch || — || align=right | 1.1 km || 
|-id=429 bgcolor=#fefefe
| 202429 ||  || — || November 30, 2005 || Kitt Peak || Spacewatch || — || align=right data-sort-value="0.87" | 870 m || 
|-id=430 bgcolor=#fefefe
| 202430 ||  || — || November 28, 2005 || Catalina || CSS || V || align=right data-sort-value="0.92" | 920 m || 
|-id=431 bgcolor=#fefefe
| 202431 ||  || — || November 29, 2005 || Mount Lemmon || Mount Lemmon Survey || — || align=right data-sort-value="0.78" | 780 m || 
|-id=432 bgcolor=#fefefe
| 202432 ||  || — || November 28, 2005 || Catalina || CSS || H || align=right | 1.1 km || 
|-id=433 bgcolor=#fefefe
| 202433 ||  || — || November 25, 2005 || Mount Lemmon || Mount Lemmon Survey || MAS || align=right data-sort-value="0.91" | 910 m || 
|-id=434 bgcolor=#fefefe
| 202434 ||  || — || December 1, 2005 || Mount Lemmon || Mount Lemmon Survey || FLO || align=right data-sort-value="0.82" | 820 m || 
|-id=435 bgcolor=#FFC2E0
| 202435 ||  || — || December 1, 2005 || Palomar || NEAT || APO +1km || align=right data-sort-value="0.88" | 880 m || 
|-id=436 bgcolor=#fefefe
| 202436 ||  || — || December 1, 2005 || Mount Lemmon || Mount Lemmon Survey || — || align=right data-sort-value="0.93" | 930 m || 
|-id=437 bgcolor=#fefefe
| 202437 ||  || — || December 4, 2005 || Kitt Peak || Spacewatch || FLO || align=right data-sort-value="0.92" | 920 m || 
|-id=438 bgcolor=#fefefe
| 202438 ||  || — || December 5, 2005 || Kitt Peak || Spacewatch || ERI || align=right | 2.1 km || 
|-id=439 bgcolor=#fefefe
| 202439 ||  || — || December 8, 2005 || Kitt Peak || Spacewatch || — || align=right data-sort-value="0.75" | 750 m || 
|-id=440 bgcolor=#fefefe
| 202440 ||  || — || December 22, 2005 || Kitt Peak || Spacewatch || — || align=right | 1.0 km || 
|-id=441 bgcolor=#fefefe
| 202441 ||  || — || December 25, 2005 || Kitt Peak || Spacewatch || — || align=right | 2.7 km || 
|-id=442 bgcolor=#E9E9E9
| 202442 ||  || — || December 25, 2005 || Kitt Peak || Spacewatch || — || align=right | 2.0 km || 
|-id=443 bgcolor=#fefefe
| 202443 ||  || — || December 24, 2005 || Kitt Peak || Spacewatch || — || align=right | 1.1 km || 
|-id=444 bgcolor=#fefefe
| 202444 ||  || — || December 24, 2005 || Kitt Peak || Spacewatch || — || align=right | 1.1 km || 
|-id=445 bgcolor=#fefefe
| 202445 ||  || — || December 24, 2005 || Kitt Peak || Spacewatch || NYS || align=right data-sort-value="0.85" | 850 m || 
|-id=446 bgcolor=#fefefe
| 202446 ||  || — || December 26, 2005 || Mount Lemmon || Mount Lemmon Survey || V || align=right | 1.0 km || 
|-id=447 bgcolor=#fefefe
| 202447 ||  || — || December 28, 2005 || Kitt Peak || Spacewatch || FLO || align=right | 1.7 km || 
|-id=448 bgcolor=#fefefe
| 202448 ||  || — || December 25, 2005 || Kitt Peak || Spacewatch || NYS || align=right data-sort-value="0.88" | 880 m || 
|-id=449 bgcolor=#fefefe
| 202449 ||  || — || December 25, 2005 || Kitt Peak || Spacewatch || — || align=right data-sort-value="0.87" | 870 m || 
|-id=450 bgcolor=#fefefe
| 202450 ||  || — || December 26, 2005 || Kitt Peak || Spacewatch || — || align=right | 1.1 km || 
|-id=451 bgcolor=#fefefe
| 202451 ||  || — || December 28, 2005 || Catalina || CSS || FLO || align=right data-sort-value="0.92" | 920 m || 
|-id=452 bgcolor=#fefefe
| 202452 ||  || — || December 26, 2005 || Mount Lemmon || Mount Lemmon Survey || — || align=right data-sort-value="0.62" | 620 m || 
|-id=453 bgcolor=#fefefe
| 202453 ||  || — || December 29, 2005 || Kitt Peak || Spacewatch || FLO || align=right data-sort-value="0.86" | 860 m || 
|-id=454 bgcolor=#fefefe
| 202454 ||  || — || December 25, 2005 || Catalina || CSS || — || align=right | 1.3 km || 
|-id=455 bgcolor=#fefefe
| 202455 ||  || — || December 30, 2005 || Kitt Peak || Spacewatch || FLO || align=right data-sort-value="0.93" | 930 m || 
|-id=456 bgcolor=#fefefe
| 202456 ||  || — || December 30, 2005 || Kitt Peak || Spacewatch || V || align=right | 1.2 km || 
|-id=457 bgcolor=#fefefe
| 202457 ||  || — || December 25, 2005 || Kitt Peak || Spacewatch || — || align=right | 1.2 km || 
|-id=458 bgcolor=#fefefe
| 202458 ||  || — || December 25, 2005 || Kitt Peak || Spacewatch || NYS || align=right | 1.1 km || 
|-id=459 bgcolor=#fefefe
| 202459 ||  || — || December 28, 2005 || Mount Lemmon || Mount Lemmon Survey || NYS || align=right | 2.0 km || 
|-id=460 bgcolor=#fefefe
| 202460 ||  || — || December 25, 2005 || Mount Lemmon || Mount Lemmon Survey || — || align=right data-sort-value="0.80" | 800 m || 
|-id=461 bgcolor=#fefefe
| 202461 ||  || — || December 25, 2005 || Catalina || CSS || — || align=right | 1.3 km || 
|-id=462 bgcolor=#fefefe
| 202462 ||  || — || January 5, 2006 || Mount Lemmon || Mount Lemmon Survey || — || align=right | 1.3 km || 
|-id=463 bgcolor=#fefefe
| 202463 ||  || — || January 5, 2006 || Mount Lemmon || Mount Lemmon Survey || MAS || align=right | 1.3 km || 
|-id=464 bgcolor=#fefefe
| 202464 ||  || — || January 2, 2006 || Mount Lemmon || Mount Lemmon Survey || — || align=right | 1.1 km || 
|-id=465 bgcolor=#fefefe
| 202465 ||  || — || January 5, 2006 || Kitt Peak || Spacewatch || — || align=right data-sort-value="0.76" | 760 m || 
|-id=466 bgcolor=#fefefe
| 202466 ||  || — || January 5, 2006 || Catalina || CSS || FLO || align=right data-sort-value="0.81" | 810 m || 
|-id=467 bgcolor=#fefefe
| 202467 ||  || — || January 4, 2006 || Kitt Peak || Spacewatch || NYS || align=right | 1.0 km || 
|-id=468 bgcolor=#fefefe
| 202468 ||  || — || January 5, 2006 || Kitt Peak || Spacewatch || NYS || align=right | 1.9 km || 
|-id=469 bgcolor=#fefefe
| 202469 ||  || — || January 4, 2006 || Kitt Peak || Spacewatch || — || align=right | 1.0 km || 
|-id=470 bgcolor=#fefefe
| 202470 ||  || — || January 5, 2006 || Catalina || CSS || — || align=right | 1.2 km || 
|-id=471 bgcolor=#fefefe
| 202471 ||  || — || January 7, 2006 || Kitt Peak || Spacewatch || MAS || align=right data-sort-value="0.82" | 820 m || 
|-id=472 bgcolor=#fefefe
| 202472 ||  || — || January 6, 2006 || Mount Lemmon || Mount Lemmon Survey || — || align=right data-sort-value="0.70" | 700 m || 
|-id=473 bgcolor=#fefefe
| 202473 ||  || — || January 6, 2006 || Kitt Peak || Spacewatch || V || align=right | 1.0 km || 
|-id=474 bgcolor=#fefefe
| 202474 ||  || — || January 6, 2006 || Kitt Peak || Spacewatch || — || align=right | 1.1 km || 
|-id=475 bgcolor=#E9E9E9
| 202475 ||  || — || January 6, 2006 || Kitt Peak || Spacewatch || — || align=right | 1.5 km || 
|-id=476 bgcolor=#fefefe
| 202476 ||  || — || January 8, 2006 || Mount Lemmon || Mount Lemmon Survey || — || align=right data-sort-value="0.97" | 970 m || 
|-id=477 bgcolor=#d6d6d6
| 202477 ||  || — || January 7, 2006 || Mount Lemmon || Mount Lemmon Survey || — || align=right | 5.7 km || 
|-id=478 bgcolor=#fefefe
| 202478 ||  || — || January 20, 2006 || Kitt Peak || Spacewatch || — || align=right data-sort-value="0.98" | 980 m || 
|-id=479 bgcolor=#fefefe
| 202479 ||  || — || January 21, 2006 || Kitt Peak || Spacewatch || MAS || align=right data-sort-value="0.93" | 930 m || 
|-id=480 bgcolor=#fefefe
| 202480 ||  || — || January 21, 2006 || Mount Lemmon || Mount Lemmon Survey || NYS || align=right | 1.0 km || 
|-id=481 bgcolor=#fefefe
| 202481 ||  || — || January 20, 2006 || Kitt Peak || Spacewatch || — || align=right | 1.6 km || 
|-id=482 bgcolor=#E9E9E9
| 202482 ||  || — || January 20, 2006 || Kitt Peak || Spacewatch || — || align=right | 1.7 km || 
|-id=483 bgcolor=#fefefe
| 202483 ||  || — || January 23, 2006 || Mount Lemmon || Mount Lemmon Survey || — || align=right | 1.0 km || 
|-id=484 bgcolor=#E9E9E9
| 202484 ||  || — || January 21, 2006 || Kitt Peak || Spacewatch || — || align=right | 2.4 km || 
|-id=485 bgcolor=#E9E9E9
| 202485 ||  || — || January 21, 2006 || Kitt Peak || Spacewatch || — || align=right | 3.0 km || 
|-id=486 bgcolor=#fefefe
| 202486 ||  || — || January 23, 2006 || Mount Lemmon || Mount Lemmon Survey || NYS || align=right | 1.0 km || 
|-id=487 bgcolor=#fefefe
| 202487 ||  || — || January 25, 2006 || Kitt Peak || Spacewatch || NYS || align=right | 1.9 km || 
|-id=488 bgcolor=#fefefe
| 202488 ||  || — || January 25, 2006 || Kitt Peak || Spacewatch || V || align=right data-sort-value="0.84" | 840 m || 
|-id=489 bgcolor=#fefefe
| 202489 ||  || — || January 25, 2006 || Kitt Peak || Spacewatch || NYS || align=right | 1.2 km || 
|-id=490 bgcolor=#E9E9E9
| 202490 ||  || — || January 26, 2006 || Kitt Peak || Spacewatch || — || align=right | 1.8 km || 
|-id=491 bgcolor=#fefefe
| 202491 ||  || — || January 22, 2006 || Catalina || CSS || — || align=right data-sort-value="0.94" | 940 m || 
|-id=492 bgcolor=#fefefe
| 202492 ||  || — || January 22, 2006 || Mount Lemmon || Mount Lemmon Survey || — || align=right data-sort-value="0.74" | 740 m || 
|-id=493 bgcolor=#E9E9E9
| 202493 ||  || — || January 23, 2006 || Kitt Peak || Spacewatch || — || align=right | 2.1 km || 
|-id=494 bgcolor=#fefefe
| 202494 ||  || — || January 25, 2006 || Kitt Peak || Spacewatch || MAS || align=right | 1.1 km || 
|-id=495 bgcolor=#fefefe
| 202495 ||  || — || January 25, 2006 || Kitt Peak || Spacewatch || FLO || align=right data-sort-value="0.74" | 740 m || 
|-id=496 bgcolor=#d6d6d6
| 202496 ||  || — || January 26, 2006 || Kitt Peak || Spacewatch || — || align=right | 4.4 km || 
|-id=497 bgcolor=#E9E9E9
| 202497 ||  || — || January 26, 2006 || Kitt Peak || Spacewatch || — || align=right | 1.4 km || 
|-id=498 bgcolor=#d6d6d6
| 202498 ||  || — || January 26, 2006 || Kitt Peak || Spacewatch || KOR || align=right | 1.9 km || 
|-id=499 bgcolor=#fefefe
| 202499 ||  || — || January 27, 2006 || Mount Lemmon || Mount Lemmon Survey || NYS || align=right data-sort-value="0.90" | 900 m || 
|-id=500 bgcolor=#fefefe
| 202500 ||  || — || January 21, 2006 || Kitt Peak || Spacewatch || FLO || align=right data-sort-value="0.64" | 640 m || 
|}

202501–202600 

|-bgcolor=#E9E9E9
| 202501 ||  || — || January 23, 2006 || Catalina || CSS || JUN || align=right | 2.3 km || 
|-id=502 bgcolor=#fefefe
| 202502 ||  || — || January 24, 2006 || Kitt Peak || Spacewatch || MAS || align=right | 1.2 km || 
|-id=503 bgcolor=#fefefe
| 202503 ||  || — || January 30, 2006 || 7300 Observatory || W. K. Y. Yeung || — || align=right | 1.1 km || 
|-id=504 bgcolor=#fefefe
| 202504 ||  || — || January 21, 2006 || Palomar || NEAT || — || align=right | 1.6 km || 
|-id=505 bgcolor=#fefefe
| 202505 ||  || — || January 23, 2006 || Catalina || CSS || FLO || align=right data-sort-value="0.98" | 980 m || 
|-id=506 bgcolor=#E9E9E9
| 202506 ||  || — || January 25, 2006 || Kitt Peak || Spacewatch || — || align=right | 1.4 km || 
|-id=507 bgcolor=#E9E9E9
| 202507 ||  || — || January 26, 2006 || Kitt Peak || Spacewatch || — || align=right | 1.6 km || 
|-id=508 bgcolor=#E9E9E9
| 202508 ||  || — || January 26, 2006 || Kitt Peak || Spacewatch || — || align=right | 1.0 km || 
|-id=509 bgcolor=#E9E9E9
| 202509 ||  || — || January 26, 2006 || Mount Lemmon || Mount Lemmon Survey || — || align=right | 1.4 km || 
|-id=510 bgcolor=#fefefe
| 202510 ||  || — || January 26, 2006 || Mount Lemmon || Mount Lemmon Survey || — || align=right | 2.1 km || 
|-id=511 bgcolor=#E9E9E9
| 202511 ||  || — || January 27, 2006 || Kitt Peak || Spacewatch || — || align=right | 1.6 km || 
|-id=512 bgcolor=#fefefe
| 202512 ||  || — || January 27, 2006 || Mount Lemmon || Mount Lemmon Survey || NYS || align=right data-sort-value="0.87" | 870 m || 
|-id=513 bgcolor=#fefefe
| 202513 ||  || — || January 28, 2006 || Mount Lemmon || Mount Lemmon Survey || — || align=right | 1.0 km || 
|-id=514 bgcolor=#fefefe
| 202514 ||  || — || January 30, 2006 || Kitt Peak || Spacewatch || NYS || align=right | 2.7 km || 
|-id=515 bgcolor=#fefefe
| 202515 ||  || — || January 30, 2006 || Kitt Peak || Spacewatch || — || align=right | 1.4 km || 
|-id=516 bgcolor=#fefefe
| 202516 ||  || — || January 31, 2006 || Kitt Peak || Spacewatch || MAS || align=right data-sort-value="0.85" | 850 m || 
|-id=517 bgcolor=#fefefe
| 202517 ||  || — || January 31, 2006 || Kitt Peak || Spacewatch || MAS || align=right data-sort-value="0.84" | 840 m || 
|-id=518 bgcolor=#fefefe
| 202518 ||  || — || January 31, 2006 || Kitt Peak || Spacewatch || NYS || align=right data-sort-value="0.93" | 930 m || 
|-id=519 bgcolor=#fefefe
| 202519 ||  || — || January 31, 2006 || Mount Lemmon || Mount Lemmon Survey || NYS || align=right | 1.5 km || 
|-id=520 bgcolor=#E9E9E9
| 202520 ||  || — || January 31, 2006 || Catalina || CSS || — || align=right | 1.8 km || 
|-id=521 bgcolor=#E9E9E9
| 202521 ||  || — || January 31, 2006 || Kitt Peak || Spacewatch || — || align=right data-sort-value="0.87" | 870 m || 
|-id=522 bgcolor=#d6d6d6
| 202522 ||  || — || February 2, 2006 || Kitt Peak || Spacewatch || — || align=right | 3.4 km || 
|-id=523 bgcolor=#E9E9E9
| 202523 ||  || — || February 20, 2006 || Kitt Peak || Spacewatch || — || align=right | 1.1 km || 
|-id=524 bgcolor=#fefefe
| 202524 ||  || — || February 20, 2006 || Socorro || LINEAR || — || align=right data-sort-value="0.87" | 870 m || 
|-id=525 bgcolor=#E9E9E9
| 202525 ||  || — || February 20, 2006 || Kitt Peak || Spacewatch || — || align=right | 2.7 km || 
|-id=526 bgcolor=#d6d6d6
| 202526 ||  || — || February 21, 2006 || Mount Lemmon || Mount Lemmon Survey || — || align=right | 2.7 km || 
|-id=527 bgcolor=#E9E9E9
| 202527 ||  || — || February 21, 2006 || Mount Lemmon || Mount Lemmon Survey || — || align=right | 1.4 km || 
|-id=528 bgcolor=#fefefe
| 202528 ||  || — || February 21, 2006 || Catalina || CSS || — || align=right | 1.3 km || 
|-id=529 bgcolor=#fefefe
| 202529 ||  || — || February 20, 2006 || Mount Lemmon || Mount Lemmon Survey || — || align=right data-sort-value="0.70" | 700 m || 
|-id=530 bgcolor=#d6d6d6
| 202530 ||  || — || February 20, 2006 || Kitt Peak || Spacewatch || — || align=right | 3.6 km || 
|-id=531 bgcolor=#E9E9E9
| 202531 ||  || — || February 20, 2006 || Kitt Peak || Spacewatch || — || align=right | 1.7 km || 
|-id=532 bgcolor=#E9E9E9
| 202532 ||  || — || February 20, 2006 || Kitt Peak || Spacewatch || — || align=right | 2.9 km || 
|-id=533 bgcolor=#fefefe
| 202533 ||  || — || February 20, 2006 || Kitt Peak || Spacewatch || — || align=right | 1.1 km || 
|-id=534 bgcolor=#E9E9E9
| 202534 ||  || — || February 20, 2006 || Kitt Peak || Spacewatch || HEN || align=right | 1.6 km || 
|-id=535 bgcolor=#E9E9E9
| 202535 ||  || — || February 20, 2006 || Catalina || CSS || — || align=right | 1.2 km || 
|-id=536 bgcolor=#fefefe
| 202536 ||  || — || February 24, 2006 || Kitt Peak || Spacewatch || — || align=right | 2.8 km || 
|-id=537 bgcolor=#d6d6d6
| 202537 ||  || — || February 24, 2006 || Kitt Peak || Spacewatch || K-2 || align=right | 2.1 km || 
|-id=538 bgcolor=#E9E9E9
| 202538 ||  || — || February 24, 2006 || Mount Lemmon || Mount Lemmon Survey || — || align=right | 2.5 km || 
|-id=539 bgcolor=#fefefe
| 202539 ||  || — || February 24, 2006 || Catalina || CSS || — || align=right | 1.6 km || 
|-id=540 bgcolor=#fefefe
| 202540 ||  || — || February 24, 2006 || Socorro || LINEAR || NYS || align=right | 3.1 km || 
|-id=541 bgcolor=#fefefe
| 202541 ||  || — || February 24, 2006 || Kitt Peak || Spacewatch || — || align=right data-sort-value="0.91" | 910 m || 
|-id=542 bgcolor=#d6d6d6
| 202542 ||  || — || February 24, 2006 || Kitt Peak || Spacewatch || — || align=right | 3.0 km || 
|-id=543 bgcolor=#d6d6d6
| 202543 ||  || — || February 24, 2006 || Kitt Peak || Spacewatch || — || align=right | 3.0 km || 
|-id=544 bgcolor=#E9E9E9
| 202544 ||  || — || February 27, 2006 || Kitt Peak || Spacewatch || — || align=right | 2.0 km || 
|-id=545 bgcolor=#fefefe
| 202545 ||  || — || February 24, 2006 || Mount Lemmon || Mount Lemmon Survey || — || align=right | 1.1 km || 
|-id=546 bgcolor=#E9E9E9
| 202546 ||  || — || February 25, 2006 || Mount Lemmon || Mount Lemmon Survey || — || align=right | 1.6 km || 
|-id=547 bgcolor=#d6d6d6
| 202547 ||  || — || February 25, 2006 || Kitt Peak || Spacewatch || — || align=right | 4.0 km || 
|-id=548 bgcolor=#d6d6d6
| 202548 ||  || — || February 26, 2006 || Kitt Peak || Spacewatch || — || align=right | 3.9 km || 
|-id=549 bgcolor=#fefefe
| 202549 ||  || — || February 27, 2006 || Kitt Peak || Spacewatch || NYS || align=right data-sort-value="0.73" | 730 m || 
|-id=550 bgcolor=#fefefe
| 202550 ||  || — || February 27, 2006 || Socorro || LINEAR || V || align=right data-sort-value="0.91" | 910 m || 
|-id=551 bgcolor=#d6d6d6
| 202551 ||  || — || February 27, 2006 || Kitt Peak || Spacewatch || 3:2 || align=right | 6.9 km || 
|-id=552 bgcolor=#fefefe
| 202552 ||  || — || February 21, 2006 || Catalina || CSS || — || align=right | 1.3 km || 
|-id=553 bgcolor=#fefefe
| 202553 ||  || — || February 25, 2006 || Mount Lemmon || Mount Lemmon Survey || — || align=right | 1.2 km || 
|-id=554 bgcolor=#E9E9E9
| 202554 ||  || — || February 27, 2006 || Catalina || CSS || MAR || align=right | 1.4 km || 
|-id=555 bgcolor=#E9E9E9
| 202555 ||  || — || February 23, 2006 || Anderson Mesa || LONEOS || — || align=right | 1.9 km || 
|-id=556 bgcolor=#fefefe
| 202556 ||  || — || February 22, 2006 || Anderson Mesa || LONEOS || NYS || align=right | 1.1 km || 
|-id=557 bgcolor=#fefefe
| 202557 ||  || — || February 24, 2006 || Palomar || NEAT || — || align=right | 1.2 km || 
|-id=558 bgcolor=#E9E9E9
| 202558 ||  || — || February 25, 2006 || Kitt Peak || Spacewatch || — || align=right | 2.8 km || 
|-id=559 bgcolor=#d6d6d6
| 202559 ||  || — || February 20, 2006 || Mount Lemmon || Mount Lemmon Survey || EOS || align=right | 2.5 km || 
|-id=560 bgcolor=#d6d6d6
| 202560 ||  || — || March 2, 2006 || Kitt Peak || Spacewatch || EOS || align=right | 2.1 km || 
|-id=561 bgcolor=#E9E9E9
| 202561 ||  || — || March 2, 2006 || Kitt Peak || Spacewatch || — || align=right | 1.4 km || 
|-id=562 bgcolor=#d6d6d6
| 202562 ||  || — || March 2, 2006 || Kitt Peak || Spacewatch || — || align=right | 5.1 km || 
|-id=563 bgcolor=#d6d6d6
| 202563 ||  || — || March 2, 2006 || Kitt Peak || Spacewatch || EOS || align=right | 2.8 km || 
|-id=564 bgcolor=#E9E9E9
| 202564 ||  || — || March 3, 2006 || Kitt Peak || Spacewatch || — || align=right | 1.4 km || 
|-id=565 bgcolor=#E9E9E9
| 202565 ||  || — || March 3, 2006 || Kitt Peak || Spacewatch || — || align=right | 1.8 km || 
|-id=566 bgcolor=#fefefe
| 202566 ||  || — || March 3, 2006 || Kitt Peak || Spacewatch || — || align=right | 1.2 km || 
|-id=567 bgcolor=#d6d6d6
| 202567 ||  || — || March 4, 2006 || Kitt Peak || Spacewatch || HYG || align=right | 2.8 km || 
|-id=568 bgcolor=#E9E9E9
| 202568 ||  || — || March 4, 2006 || Kitt Peak || Spacewatch || — || align=right | 1.8 km || 
|-id=569 bgcolor=#E9E9E9
| 202569 ||  || — || March 4, 2006 || Mount Lemmon || Mount Lemmon Survey || NEM || align=right | 2.2 km || 
|-id=570 bgcolor=#E9E9E9
| 202570 ||  || — || March 5, 2006 || Kitt Peak || Spacewatch || — || align=right | 1.9 km || 
|-id=571 bgcolor=#E9E9E9
| 202571 ||  || — || March 2, 2006 || Kitt Peak || Spacewatch || — || align=right | 1.1 km || 
|-id=572 bgcolor=#d6d6d6
| 202572 ||  || — || March 23, 2006 || Kitt Peak || Spacewatch || KOR || align=right | 2.6 km || 
|-id=573 bgcolor=#d6d6d6
| 202573 ||  || — || March 23, 2006 || Kitt Peak || Spacewatch || — || align=right | 3.1 km || 
|-id=574 bgcolor=#E9E9E9
| 202574 ||  || — || March 23, 2006 || Kitt Peak || Spacewatch || PAD || align=right | 3.4 km || 
|-id=575 bgcolor=#d6d6d6
| 202575 ||  || — || March 23, 2006 || Kitt Peak || Spacewatch || — || align=right | 4.2 km || 
|-id=576 bgcolor=#E9E9E9
| 202576 ||  || — || March 23, 2006 || Mount Lemmon || Mount Lemmon Survey || — || align=right | 2.9 km || 
|-id=577 bgcolor=#E9E9E9
| 202577 ||  || — || March 23, 2006 || Mount Lemmon || Mount Lemmon Survey || — || align=right | 2.8 km || 
|-id=578 bgcolor=#fefefe
| 202578 ||  || — || March 24, 2006 || Kitt Peak || Spacewatch || — || align=right | 1.4 km || 
|-id=579 bgcolor=#E9E9E9
| 202579 ||  || — || March 24, 2006 || Kitt Peak || Spacewatch || HEN || align=right | 1.6 km || 
|-id=580 bgcolor=#E9E9E9
| 202580 ||  || — || March 24, 2006 || Mount Lemmon || Mount Lemmon Survey || — || align=right | 1.9 km || 
|-id=581 bgcolor=#d6d6d6
| 202581 ||  || — || March 25, 2006 || Kitt Peak || Spacewatch || THM || align=right | 3.0 km || 
|-id=582 bgcolor=#E9E9E9
| 202582 ||  || — || March 23, 2006 || Catalina || CSS || GER || align=right | 2.6 km || 
|-id=583 bgcolor=#E9E9E9
| 202583 ||  || — || March 25, 2006 || Kitt Peak || Spacewatch || — || align=right | 1.8 km || 
|-id=584 bgcolor=#E9E9E9
| 202584 ||  || — || April 7, 2006 || Junk Bond || D. Healy || — || align=right | 2.5 km || 
|-id=585 bgcolor=#fefefe
| 202585 ||  || — || April 2, 2006 || Kitt Peak || Spacewatch || NYS || align=right data-sort-value="0.84" | 840 m || 
|-id=586 bgcolor=#E9E9E9
| 202586 ||  || — || April 2, 2006 || Kitt Peak || Spacewatch || AST || align=right | 3.4 km || 
|-id=587 bgcolor=#d6d6d6
| 202587 ||  || — || April 2, 2006 || Kitt Peak || Spacewatch || — || align=right | 4.7 km || 
|-id=588 bgcolor=#E9E9E9
| 202588 ||  || — || April 8, 2006 || Kitt Peak || Spacewatch || — || align=right | 2.6 km || 
|-id=589 bgcolor=#E9E9E9
| 202589 ||  || — || April 6, 2006 || Siding Spring || SSS || EUN || align=right | 1.8 km || 
|-id=590 bgcolor=#E9E9E9
| 202590 ||  || — || April 6, 2006 || Socorro || LINEAR || — || align=right | 1.7 km || 
|-id=591 bgcolor=#E9E9E9
| 202591 ||  || — || April 9, 2006 || Kitt Peak || Spacewatch || — || align=right | 2.7 km || 
|-id=592 bgcolor=#E9E9E9
| 202592 ||  || — || April 9, 2006 || Anderson Mesa || LONEOS || — || align=right | 2.3 km || 
|-id=593 bgcolor=#fefefe
| 202593 ||  || — || April 7, 2006 || Catalina || CSS || — || align=right | 1.6 km || 
|-id=594 bgcolor=#d6d6d6
| 202594 ||  || — || April 2, 2006 || Kitt Peak || Spacewatch || — || align=right | 2.9 km || 
|-id=595 bgcolor=#d6d6d6
| 202595 ||  || — || April 19, 2006 || Mount Lemmon || Mount Lemmon Survey || KAR || align=right | 1.5 km || 
|-id=596 bgcolor=#d6d6d6
| 202596 ||  || — || April 18, 2006 || Kitt Peak || Spacewatch || — || align=right | 2.8 km || 
|-id=597 bgcolor=#E9E9E9
| 202597 ||  || — || April 21, 2006 || Palomar || NEAT || EUN || align=right | 2.3 km || 
|-id=598 bgcolor=#d6d6d6
| 202598 ||  || — || April 18, 2006 || Catalina || CSS || TIR || align=right | 4.8 km || 
|-id=599 bgcolor=#fefefe
| 202599 ||  || — || April 24, 2006 || Piszkéstető || K. Sárneczky || — || align=right data-sort-value="0.88" | 880 m || 
|-id=600 bgcolor=#E9E9E9
| 202600 ||  || — || April 19, 2006 || Mount Lemmon || Mount Lemmon Survey || MRX || align=right | 1.2 km || 
|}

202601–202700 

|-bgcolor=#E9E9E9
| 202601 ||  || — || April 20, 2006 || Kitt Peak || Spacewatch || HOF || align=right | 3.9 km || 
|-id=602 bgcolor=#E9E9E9
| 202602 ||  || — || April 20, 2006 || Kitt Peak || Spacewatch || — || align=right | 3.1 km || 
|-id=603 bgcolor=#d6d6d6
| 202603 ||  || — || April 20, 2006 || Kitt Peak || Spacewatch || KOR || align=right | 2.1 km || 
|-id=604 bgcolor=#d6d6d6
| 202604 ||  || — || April 20, 2006 || Kitt Peak || Spacewatch || — || align=right | 3.6 km || 
|-id=605 bgcolor=#d6d6d6
| 202605 Shenchunshan ||  ||  || April 18, 2006 || Lulin Observatory || Q.-z. Ye, T.-C. Yang || — || align=right | 3.4 km || 
|-id=606 bgcolor=#d6d6d6
| 202606 ||  || — || April 19, 2006 || Mount Lemmon || Mount Lemmon Survey || — || align=right | 5.0 km || 
|-id=607 bgcolor=#E9E9E9
| 202607 ||  || — || April 21, 2006 || Kitt Peak || Spacewatch || — || align=right | 2.5 km || 
|-id=608 bgcolor=#d6d6d6
| 202608 ||  || — || April 24, 2006 || Mount Lemmon || Mount Lemmon Survey || — || align=right | 2.7 km || 
|-id=609 bgcolor=#d6d6d6
| 202609 ||  || — || April 24, 2006 || Mount Lemmon || Mount Lemmon Survey || — || align=right | 3.3 km || 
|-id=610 bgcolor=#d6d6d6
| 202610 ||  || — || April 25, 2006 || Kitt Peak || Spacewatch || — || align=right | 3.9 km || 
|-id=611 bgcolor=#E9E9E9
| 202611 ||  || — || April 26, 2006 || Mount Lemmon || Mount Lemmon Survey || — || align=right | 1.9 km || 
|-id=612 bgcolor=#E9E9E9
| 202612 ||  || — || April 19, 2006 || Catalina || CSS || — || align=right | 2.0 km || 
|-id=613 bgcolor=#d6d6d6
| 202613 ||  || — || April 21, 2006 || Socorro || LINEAR || — || align=right | 5.4 km || 
|-id=614 bgcolor=#E9E9E9
| 202614 Kayleigh ||  ||  || April 30, 2006 || Kambah || D. Herald || MAR || align=right | 1.6 km || 
|-id=615 bgcolor=#d6d6d6
| 202615 ||  || — || April 24, 2006 || Kitt Peak || Spacewatch || — || align=right | 2.9 km || 
|-id=616 bgcolor=#E9E9E9
| 202616 ||  || — || April 24, 2006 || Kitt Peak || Spacewatch || — || align=right | 1.8 km || 
|-id=617 bgcolor=#d6d6d6
| 202617 ||  || — || April 24, 2006 || Kitt Peak || Spacewatch || — || align=right | 3.6 km || 
|-id=618 bgcolor=#d6d6d6
| 202618 ||  || — || April 25, 2006 || Kitt Peak || Spacewatch || — || align=right | 5.6 km || 
|-id=619 bgcolor=#d6d6d6
| 202619 ||  || — || April 25, 2006 || Kitt Peak || Spacewatch || HYG || align=right | 4.4 km || 
|-id=620 bgcolor=#d6d6d6
| 202620 ||  || — || April 25, 2006 || Kitt Peak || Spacewatch || — || align=right | 4.7 km || 
|-id=621 bgcolor=#E9E9E9
| 202621 ||  || — || April 26, 2006 || Kitt Peak || Spacewatch || — || align=right data-sort-value="0.93" | 930 m || 
|-id=622 bgcolor=#d6d6d6
| 202622 ||  || — || April 26, 2006 || Kitt Peak || Spacewatch || THM || align=right | 3.3 km || 
|-id=623 bgcolor=#d6d6d6
| 202623 ||  || — || April 26, 2006 || Kitt Peak || Spacewatch || — || align=right | 5.3 km || 
|-id=624 bgcolor=#E9E9E9
| 202624 ||  || — || April 26, 2006 || Kitt Peak || Spacewatch || — || align=right | 2.4 km || 
|-id=625 bgcolor=#d6d6d6
| 202625 ||  || — || April 26, 2006 || Kitt Peak || Spacewatch || — || align=right | 6.5 km || 
|-id=626 bgcolor=#d6d6d6
| 202626 ||  || — || April 26, 2006 || Kitt Peak || Spacewatch || — || align=right | 2.9 km || 
|-id=627 bgcolor=#d6d6d6
| 202627 ||  || — || April 26, 2006 || Kitt Peak || Spacewatch || — || align=right | 2.8 km || 
|-id=628 bgcolor=#d6d6d6
| 202628 ||  || — || April 30, 2006 || Kitt Peak || Spacewatch || THM || align=right | 3.4 km || 
|-id=629 bgcolor=#E9E9E9
| 202629 ||  || — || April 30, 2006 || Kitt Peak || Spacewatch || — || align=right | 3.3 km || 
|-id=630 bgcolor=#d6d6d6
| 202630 ||  || — || April 30, 2006 || Kitt Peak || Spacewatch || BRA || align=right | 2.7 km || 
|-id=631 bgcolor=#d6d6d6
| 202631 ||  || — || April 27, 2006 || Kitt Peak || Spacewatch || THM || align=right | 2.8 km || 
|-id=632 bgcolor=#d6d6d6
| 202632 ||  || — || April 30, 2006 || Kitt Peak || Spacewatch || KOR || align=right | 1.7 km || 
|-id=633 bgcolor=#d6d6d6
| 202633 ||  || — || April 24, 2006 || Mount Lemmon || Mount Lemmon Survey || K-2 || align=right | 1.7 km || 
|-id=634 bgcolor=#d6d6d6
| 202634 ||  || — || April 30, 2006 || Kitt Peak || Spacewatch || — || align=right | 3.5 km || 
|-id=635 bgcolor=#E9E9E9
| 202635 ||  || — || May 1, 2006 || Kitt Peak || Spacewatch || — || align=right | 1.9 km || 
|-id=636 bgcolor=#d6d6d6
| 202636 ||  || — || May 2, 2006 || Mount Lemmon || Mount Lemmon Survey || KOR || align=right | 1.9 km || 
|-id=637 bgcolor=#d6d6d6
| 202637 ||  || — || May 2, 2006 || Mount Lemmon || Mount Lemmon Survey || HYG || align=right | 5.7 km || 
|-id=638 bgcolor=#E9E9E9
| 202638 ||  || — || May 1, 2006 || Kitt Peak || Spacewatch || — || align=right | 3.0 km || 
|-id=639 bgcolor=#E9E9E9
| 202639 ||  || — || May 1, 2006 || Kitt Peak || Spacewatch || — || align=right | 1.5 km || 
|-id=640 bgcolor=#E9E9E9
| 202640 ||  || — || May 3, 2006 || Mount Lemmon || Mount Lemmon Survey || — || align=right | 2.7 km || 
|-id=641 bgcolor=#d6d6d6
| 202641 ||  || — || May 2, 2006 || Mount Lemmon || Mount Lemmon Survey || KOR || align=right | 1.7 km || 
|-id=642 bgcolor=#E9E9E9
| 202642 ||  || — || May 2, 2006 || Mount Lemmon || Mount Lemmon Survey || — || align=right | 2.2 km || 
|-id=643 bgcolor=#E9E9E9
| 202643 ||  || — || May 2, 2006 || Mount Lemmon || Mount Lemmon Survey || HEN || align=right | 1.3 km || 
|-id=644 bgcolor=#d6d6d6
| 202644 ||  || — || May 4, 2006 || Mount Lemmon || Mount Lemmon Survey || THM || align=right | 2.6 km || 
|-id=645 bgcolor=#d6d6d6
| 202645 ||  || — || May 4, 2006 || Kitt Peak || Spacewatch || THM || align=right | 3.5 km || 
|-id=646 bgcolor=#d6d6d6
| 202646 ||  || — || May 4, 2006 || Kitt Peak || Spacewatch || — || align=right | 2.7 km || 
|-id=647 bgcolor=#E9E9E9
| 202647 ||  || — || May 6, 2006 || Kitt Peak || Spacewatch || — || align=right | 2.8 km || 
|-id=648 bgcolor=#E9E9E9
| 202648 ||  || — || May 2, 2006 || Nyukasa || Mount Nyukasa Stn. || — || align=right | 2.8 km || 
|-id=649 bgcolor=#d6d6d6
| 202649 ||  || — || May 1, 2006 || Socorro || LINEAR || — || align=right | 3.8 km || 
|-id=650 bgcolor=#E9E9E9
| 202650 ||  || — || May 1, 2006 || Socorro || LINEAR || MAR || align=right | 1.7 km || 
|-id=651 bgcolor=#E9E9E9
| 202651 ||  || — || May 6, 2006 || Siding Spring || SSS || — || align=right | 2.3 km || 
|-id=652 bgcolor=#d6d6d6
| 202652 ||  || — || May 5, 2006 || Kitt Peak || Spacewatch || — || align=right | 4.8 km || 
|-id=653 bgcolor=#d6d6d6
| 202653 || 2006 KW || — || May 18, 2006 || Palomar || NEAT || — || align=right | 5.1 km || 
|-id=654 bgcolor=#E9E9E9
| 202654 ||  || — || May 19, 2006 || Mount Lemmon || Mount Lemmon Survey || — || align=right | 2.4 km || 
|-id=655 bgcolor=#d6d6d6
| 202655 ||  || — || May 19, 2006 || Mount Lemmon || Mount Lemmon Survey || KOR || align=right | 1.9 km || 
|-id=656 bgcolor=#d6d6d6
| 202656 ||  || — || May 19, 2006 || Mount Lemmon || Mount Lemmon Survey || — || align=right | 3.9 km || 
|-id=657 bgcolor=#d6d6d6
| 202657 ||  || — || May 20, 2006 || Kitt Peak || Spacewatch || K-2 || align=right | 2.1 km || 
|-id=658 bgcolor=#E9E9E9
| 202658 ||  || — || May 20, 2006 || Mount Lemmon || Mount Lemmon Survey || — || align=right | 1.9 km || 
|-id=659 bgcolor=#E9E9E9
| 202659 ||  || — || May 20, 2006 || Mount Lemmon || Mount Lemmon Survey || — || align=right | 2.9 km || 
|-id=660 bgcolor=#E9E9E9
| 202660 ||  || — || May 19, 2006 || Palomar || NEAT || — || align=right | 4.1 km || 
|-id=661 bgcolor=#d6d6d6
| 202661 ||  || — || May 21, 2006 || Kitt Peak || Spacewatch || — || align=right | 3.3 km || 
|-id=662 bgcolor=#E9E9E9
| 202662 ||  || — || May 23, 2006 || Mount Lemmon || Mount Lemmon Survey || — || align=right | 1.1 km || 
|-id=663 bgcolor=#fefefe
| 202663 ||  || — || May 24, 2006 || Mount Lemmon || Mount Lemmon Survey || — || align=right | 1.4 km || 
|-id=664 bgcolor=#d6d6d6
| 202664 ||  || — || May 25, 2006 || Kitt Peak || Spacewatch || — || align=right | 3.8 km || 
|-id=665 bgcolor=#E9E9E9
| 202665 ||  || — || May 24, 2006 || Palomar || NEAT || — || align=right | 2.0 km || 
|-id=666 bgcolor=#d6d6d6
| 202666 ||  || — || May 25, 2006 || Mount Lemmon || Mount Lemmon Survey || — || align=right | 3.0 km || 
|-id=667 bgcolor=#d6d6d6
| 202667 ||  || — || May 27, 2006 || Kitt Peak || Spacewatch || — || align=right | 3.4 km || 
|-id=668 bgcolor=#fefefe
| 202668 ||  || — || May 31, 2006 || Mount Lemmon || Mount Lemmon Survey || — || align=right | 1.2 km || 
|-id=669 bgcolor=#E9E9E9
| 202669 ||  || — || May 31, 2006 || Mount Lemmon || Mount Lemmon Survey || — || align=right | 3.1 km || 
|-id=670 bgcolor=#d6d6d6
| 202670 ||  || — || May 29, 2006 || Kitt Peak || Spacewatch || — || align=right | 2.8 km || 
|-id=671 bgcolor=#E9E9E9
| 202671 ||  || — || May 21, 2006 || Palomar || NEAT || — || align=right | 3.8 km || 
|-id=672 bgcolor=#d6d6d6
| 202672 ||  || — || May 23, 2006 || Kitt Peak || Spacewatch || VER || align=right | 5.4 km || 
|-id=673 bgcolor=#d6d6d6
| 202673 ||  || — || June 14, 2006 || Siding Spring || SSS || — || align=right | 6.8 km || 
|-id=674 bgcolor=#E9E9E9
| 202674 ||  || — || June 5, 2006 || Socorro || LINEAR || — || align=right | 3.0 km || 
|-id=675 bgcolor=#d6d6d6
| 202675 ||  || — || June 16, 2006 || Kitt Peak || Spacewatch || URS || align=right | 5.8 km || 
|-id=676 bgcolor=#E9E9E9
| 202676 ||  || — || June 18, 2006 || Kitt Peak || Spacewatch || — || align=right | 3.9 km || 
|-id=677 bgcolor=#d6d6d6
| 202677 ||  || — || August 19, 2006 || Anderson Mesa || LONEOS || — || align=right | 3.8 km || 
|-id=678 bgcolor=#d6d6d6
| 202678 ||  || — || August 30, 2006 || Anderson Mesa || LONEOS || — || align=right | 5.8 km || 
|-id=679 bgcolor=#E9E9E9
| 202679 ||  || — || September 19, 2006 || Catalina || CSS || — || align=right | 2.5 km || 
|-id=680 bgcolor=#d6d6d6
| 202680 ||  || — || October 10, 2006 || Palomar || NEAT || — || align=right | 5.5 km || 
|-id=681 bgcolor=#E9E9E9
| 202681 ||  || — || October 17, 2006 || Kitt Peak || Spacewatch || — || align=right | 3.0 km || 
|-id=682 bgcolor=#E9E9E9
| 202682 ||  || — || October 19, 2006 || Mount Lemmon || Mount Lemmon Survey || — || align=right | 1.5 km || 
|-id=683 bgcolor=#FFC2E0
| 202683 ||  || — || October 30, 2006 || Mount Lemmon || Mount Lemmon Survey || ATEPHAcritical || align=right data-sort-value="0.39" | 390 m || 
|-id=684 bgcolor=#E9E9E9
| 202684 ||  || — || November 11, 2006 || Kitt Peak || Spacewatch || — || align=right | 2.2 km || 
|-id=685 bgcolor=#fefefe
| 202685 ||  || — || November 14, 2006 || Kitt Peak || Spacewatch || — || align=right data-sort-value="0.76" | 760 m || 
|-id=686 bgcolor=#fefefe
| 202686 Birkfellner ||  ||  || February 9, 2007 || Gaisberg || R. Gierlinger || — || align=right | 1.2 km || 
|-id=687 bgcolor=#fefefe
| 202687 ||  || — || February 17, 2007 || Mount Lemmon || Mount Lemmon Survey || — || align=right | 1.2 km || 
|-id=688 bgcolor=#fefefe
| 202688 ||  || — || February 21, 2007 || Nyukasa || Mount Nyukasa Stn. || FLO || align=right data-sort-value="0.83" | 830 m || 
|-id=689 bgcolor=#fefefe
| 202689 ||  || — || February 25, 2007 || Kitt Peak || Spacewatch || NYS || align=right | 1.0 km || 
|-id=690 bgcolor=#fefefe
| 202690 ||  || — || March 9, 2007 || Kitt Peak || Spacewatch || FLO || align=right data-sort-value="0.95" | 950 m || 
|-id=691 bgcolor=#fefefe
| 202691 ||  || — || March 10, 2007 || Kitt Peak || Spacewatch || NYS || align=right data-sort-value="0.94" | 940 m || 
|-id=692 bgcolor=#fefefe
| 202692 ||  || — || March 11, 2007 || Mount Lemmon || Mount Lemmon Survey || — || align=right data-sort-value="0.75" | 750 m || 
|-id=693 bgcolor=#E9E9E9
| 202693 ||  || — || March 13, 2007 || Mount Lemmon || Mount Lemmon Survey || EUN || align=right | 1.4 km || 
|-id=694 bgcolor=#fefefe
| 202694 ||  || — || March 14, 2007 || Kitt Peak || Spacewatch || — || align=right | 1.0 km || 
|-id=695 bgcolor=#fefefe
| 202695 ||  || — || March 12, 2007 || Mount Lemmon || Mount Lemmon Survey || — || align=right | 1.1 km || 
|-id=696 bgcolor=#fefefe
| 202696 ||  || — || March 13, 2007 || Mount Lemmon || Mount Lemmon Survey || — || align=right data-sort-value="0.83" | 830 m || 
|-id=697 bgcolor=#E9E9E9
| 202697 ||  || — || March 14, 2007 || Anderson Mesa || LONEOS || INO || align=right | 1.6 km || 
|-id=698 bgcolor=#fefefe
| 202698 ||  || — || March 15, 2007 || Mount Lemmon || Mount Lemmon Survey || — || align=right | 1.3 km || 
|-id=699 bgcolor=#fefefe
| 202699 ||  || — || March 13, 2007 || Mount Lemmon || Mount Lemmon Survey || EUT || align=right data-sort-value="0.87" | 870 m || 
|-id=700 bgcolor=#E9E9E9
| 202700 ||  || — || March 26, 2007 || Mount Lemmon || Mount Lemmon Survey || — || align=right | 1.8 km || 
|}

202701–202800 

|-bgcolor=#fefefe
| 202701 ||  || — || March 25, 2007 || Catalina || CSS || H || align=right data-sort-value="0.88" | 880 m || 
|-id=702 bgcolor=#fefefe
| 202702 ||  || — || March 26, 2007 || Catalina || CSS || H || align=right data-sort-value="0.95" | 950 m || 
|-id=703 bgcolor=#E9E9E9
| 202703 ||  || — || March 28, 2007 || Siding Spring || SSS || — || align=right | 4.8 km || 
|-id=704 bgcolor=#fefefe
| 202704 Utena ||  ||  || April 14, 2007 || Moletai || K. Černis, J. Zdanavičius || — || align=right | 1.1 km || 
|-id=705 bgcolor=#fefefe
| 202705 ||  || — || April 11, 2007 || Kitt Peak || Spacewatch || — || align=right | 1.0 km || 
|-id=706 bgcolor=#E9E9E9
| 202706 ||  || — || April 11, 2007 || Kitt Peak || Spacewatch || — || align=right | 2.8 km || 
|-id=707 bgcolor=#fefefe
| 202707 ||  || — || April 11, 2007 || Mount Lemmon || Mount Lemmon Survey || MAS || align=right data-sort-value="0.85" | 850 m || 
|-id=708 bgcolor=#fefefe
| 202708 ||  || — || April 11, 2007 || Mount Lemmon || Mount Lemmon Survey || MAS || align=right data-sort-value="0.82" | 820 m || 
|-id=709 bgcolor=#E9E9E9
| 202709 ||  || — || April 12, 2007 || Siding Spring || SSS || — || align=right | 4.0 km || 
|-id=710 bgcolor=#fefefe
| 202710 ||  || — || April 14, 2007 || Kitt Peak || Spacewatch || — || align=right | 1.2 km || 
|-id=711 bgcolor=#fefefe
| 202711 ||  || — || April 15, 2007 || Kitt Peak || Spacewatch || — || align=right | 1.1 km || 
|-id=712 bgcolor=#E9E9E9
| 202712 ||  || — || April 15, 2007 || Kitt Peak || Spacewatch || — || align=right | 1.6 km || 
|-id=713 bgcolor=#fefefe
| 202713 ||  || — || April 15, 2007 || Kitt Peak || Spacewatch || FLO || align=right data-sort-value="0.49" | 490 m || 
|-id=714 bgcolor=#fefefe
| 202714 ||  || — || April 18, 2007 || Anderson Mesa || LONEOS || V || align=right data-sort-value="0.80" | 800 m || 
|-id=715 bgcolor=#E9E9E9
| 202715 ||  || — || April 19, 2007 || Lulin Observatory || LUSS || — || align=right | 1.8 km || 
|-id=716 bgcolor=#E9E9E9
| 202716 ||  || — || April 18, 2007 || Anderson Mesa || LONEOS || — || align=right | 1.3 km || 
|-id=717 bgcolor=#fefefe
| 202717 ||  || — || April 18, 2007 || Kitt Peak || Spacewatch || FLO || align=right data-sort-value="0.78" | 780 m || 
|-id=718 bgcolor=#fefefe
| 202718 ||  || — || April 18, 2007 || Mount Lemmon || Mount Lemmon Survey || — || align=right data-sort-value="0.98" | 980 m || 
|-id=719 bgcolor=#d6d6d6
| 202719 ||  || — || April 18, 2007 || Mount Lemmon || Mount Lemmon Survey || HYG || align=right | 3.0 km || 
|-id=720 bgcolor=#E9E9E9
| 202720 ||  || — || April 19, 2007 || Kitt Peak || Spacewatch || — || align=right | 1.7 km || 
|-id=721 bgcolor=#fefefe
| 202721 ||  || — || April 19, 2007 || Kitt Peak || Spacewatch || H || align=right data-sort-value="0.79" | 790 m || 
|-id=722 bgcolor=#E9E9E9
| 202722 ||  || — || April 22, 2007 || Mount Lemmon || Mount Lemmon Survey || MAR || align=right | 1.4 km || 
|-id=723 bgcolor=#E9E9E9
| 202723 ||  || — || April 22, 2007 || Mount Lemmon || Mount Lemmon Survey || BRG || align=right | 1.4 km || 
|-id=724 bgcolor=#E9E9E9
| 202724 ||  || — || April 22, 2007 || Mount Lemmon || Mount Lemmon Survey || JUN || align=right | 3.1 km || 
|-id=725 bgcolor=#E9E9E9
| 202725 ||  || — || April 22, 2007 || Kitt Peak || Spacewatch || — || align=right | 2.4 km || 
|-id=726 bgcolor=#fefefe
| 202726 ||  || — || April 23, 2007 || Mount Lemmon || Mount Lemmon Survey || — || align=right | 1.4 km || 
|-id=727 bgcolor=#fefefe
| 202727 ||  || — || April 25, 2007 || Kitt Peak || Spacewatch || — || align=right | 1.0 km || 
|-id=728 bgcolor=#E9E9E9
| 202728 ||  || — || May 9, 2007 || Reedy Creek || J. Broughton || — || align=right | 3.3 km || 
|-id=729 bgcolor=#E9E9E9
| 202729 ||  || — || May 7, 2007 || Kitt Peak || Spacewatch || — || align=right | 2.0 km || 
|-id=730 bgcolor=#E9E9E9
| 202730 ||  || — || May 7, 2007 || Kitt Peak || Spacewatch || — || align=right | 2.7 km || 
|-id=731 bgcolor=#fefefe
| 202731 ||  || — || May 9, 2007 || Mount Lemmon || Mount Lemmon Survey || — || align=right data-sort-value="0.95" | 950 m || 
|-id=732 bgcolor=#E9E9E9
| 202732 ||  || — || May 10, 2007 || Mount Lemmon || Mount Lemmon Survey || — || align=right | 1.7 km || 
|-id=733 bgcolor=#E9E9E9
| 202733 ||  || — || May 9, 2007 || Kitt Peak || Spacewatch || AER || align=right | 2.2 km || 
|-id=734 bgcolor=#fefefe
| 202734 ||  || — || May 12, 2007 || Mount Lemmon || Mount Lemmon Survey || V || align=right data-sort-value="0.91" | 910 m || 
|-id=735 bgcolor=#fefefe
| 202735 ||  || — || May 17, 2007 || Kitt Peak || Spacewatch || NYS || align=right data-sort-value="0.77" | 770 m || 
|-id=736 bgcolor=#fefefe
| 202736 Julietclare ||  ||  || May 18, 2007 || Heidelberg || F. Hormuth || MAS || align=right data-sort-value="0.96" | 960 m || 
|-id=737 bgcolor=#d6d6d6
| 202737 ||  || — || May 24, 2007 || Mount Lemmon || Mount Lemmon Survey || KOR || align=right | 2.0 km || 
|-id=738 bgcolor=#d6d6d6
| 202738 ||  || — || June 10, 2007 || Bisei SG Center || BATTeRS || — || align=right | 4.6 km || 
|-id=739 bgcolor=#fefefe
| 202739 ||  || — || June 15, 2007 || Kitt Peak || Spacewatch || — || align=right | 1.1 km || 
|-id=740 bgcolor=#d6d6d6
| 202740 Vicsympho ||  ||  || June 11, 2007 || Mauna Kea || D. D. Balam || — || align=right | 3.4 km || 
|-id=741 bgcolor=#fefefe
| 202741 ||  || — || June 15, 2007 || Socorro || LINEAR || — || align=right | 4.0 km || 
|-id=742 bgcolor=#d6d6d6
| 202742 ||  || — || June 21, 2007 || Mount Lemmon || Mount Lemmon Survey || — || align=right | 3.0 km || 
|-id=743 bgcolor=#d6d6d6
| 202743 ||  || — || June 21, 2007 || Mount Lemmon || Mount Lemmon Survey || KOR || align=right | 2.1 km || 
|-id=744 bgcolor=#fefefe
| 202744 ||  || — || June 20, 2007 || Kitt Peak || Spacewatch || — || align=right | 1.4 km || 
|-id=745 bgcolor=#d6d6d6
| 202745 || 2007 ND || — || July 6, 2007 || Reedy Creek || J. Broughton || — || align=right | 4.9 km || 
|-id=746 bgcolor=#E9E9E9
| 202746 || 2007 NO || — || July 8, 2007 || Reedy Creek || J. Broughton || — || align=right | 4.4 km || 
|-id=747 bgcolor=#fefefe
| 202747 ||  || — || July 18, 2007 || Reedy Creek || J. Broughton || — || align=right | 1.8 km || 
|-id=748 bgcolor=#E9E9E9
| 202748 ||  || — || July 18, 2007 || Eskridge || Farpoint Obs. || — || align=right | 2.4 km || 
|-id=749 bgcolor=#d6d6d6
| 202749 ||  || — || August 6, 2007 || Siding Spring || SSS || — || align=right | 4.5 km || 
|-id=750 bgcolor=#d6d6d6
| 202750 ||  || — || August 9, 2007 || La Cañada || J. Lacruz || EOS || align=right | 2.9 km || 
|-id=751 bgcolor=#fefefe
| 202751 ||  || — || August 12, 2007 || Socorro || LINEAR || — || align=right | 1.9 km || 
|-id=752 bgcolor=#C2FFFF
| 202752 ||  || — || August 5, 2007 || Socorro || LINEAR || L4 || align=right | 21 km || 
|-id=753 bgcolor=#d6d6d6
| 202753 ||  || — || August 7, 2007 || Siding Spring || SSS || — || align=right | 5.9 km || 
|-id=754 bgcolor=#d6d6d6
| 202754 ||  || — || August 9, 2007 || Kitt Peak || Spacewatch || — || align=right | 3.4 km || 
|-id=755 bgcolor=#d6d6d6
| 202755 ||  || — || August 20, 2007 || Bisei SG Center || BATTeRS || — || align=right | 3.6 km || 
|-id=756 bgcolor=#C2FFFF
| 202756 ||  || — || August 23, 2007 || Kitt Peak || Spacewatch || L4 || align=right | 12 km || 
|-id=757 bgcolor=#fefefe
| 202757 ||  || — || August 23, 2007 || Kitt Peak || Spacewatch || — || align=right | 1.2 km || 
|-id=758 bgcolor=#C2FFFF
| 202758 ||  || — || September 4, 2007 || Junk Bond || D. Healy || L4 || align=right | 12 km || 
|-id=759 bgcolor=#d6d6d6
| 202759 ||  || — || September 9, 2007 || Kitt Peak || Spacewatch || — || align=right | 4.6 km || 
|-id=760 bgcolor=#d6d6d6
| 202760 ||  || — || September 10, 2007 || Mount Lemmon || Mount Lemmon Survey || — || align=right | 2.9 km || 
|-id=761 bgcolor=#d6d6d6
| 202761 ||  || — || September 10, 2007 || Mount Lemmon || Mount Lemmon Survey || KOR || align=right | 1.7 km || 
|-id=762 bgcolor=#d6d6d6
| 202762 ||  || — || September 10, 2007 || Kitt Peak || Spacewatch || — || align=right | 3.8 km || 
|-id=763 bgcolor=#d6d6d6
| 202763 ||  || — || September 10, 2007 || Kitt Peak || Spacewatch || K-2 || align=right | 2.3 km || 
|-id=764 bgcolor=#d6d6d6
| 202764 ||  || — || September 10, 2007 || Kitt Peak || Spacewatch || HYG || align=right | 4.1 km || 
|-id=765 bgcolor=#E9E9E9
| 202765 ||  || — || September 10, 2007 || Mount Lemmon || Mount Lemmon Survey || MRX || align=right | 1.6 km || 
|-id=766 bgcolor=#d6d6d6
| 202766 ||  || — || September 13, 2007 || Mount Lemmon || Mount Lemmon Survey || — || align=right | 4.5 km || 
|-id=767 bgcolor=#E9E9E9
| 202767 ||  || — || September 14, 2007 || Mount Lemmon || Mount Lemmon Survey || — || align=right | 1.7 km || 
|-id=768 bgcolor=#fefefe
| 202768 ||  || — || September 11, 2007 || Mount Lemmon || Mount Lemmon Survey || — || align=right | 1.00 km || 
|-id=769 bgcolor=#fefefe
| 202769 ||  || — || September 12, 2007 || Catalina || CSS || V || align=right | 1.2 km || 
|-id=770 bgcolor=#d6d6d6
| 202770 ||  || — || September 14, 2007 || Catalina || CSS || HYG || align=right | 4.7 km || 
|-id=771 bgcolor=#d6d6d6
| 202771 ||  || — || September 5, 2007 || Catalina || CSS || 7:4 || align=right | 7.1 km || 
|-id=772 bgcolor=#fefefe
| 202772 || 2007 TS || — || October 3, 2007 || RAS || A. Lowe || — || align=right | 1.5 km || 
|-id=773 bgcolor=#E9E9E9
| 202773 ||  || — || October 3, 2007 || Tiki || Tiki Obs. || — || align=right | 4.3 km || 
|-id=774 bgcolor=#E9E9E9
| 202774 ||  || — || October 7, 2007 || Kitt Peak || Spacewatch || — || align=right | 2.2 km || 
|-id=775 bgcolor=#d6d6d6
| 202775 ||  || — || October 9, 2007 || Mount Lemmon || Mount Lemmon Survey || KOR || align=right | 1.9 km || 
|-id=776 bgcolor=#E9E9E9
| 202776 ||  || — || October 14, 2007 || Mount Lemmon || Mount Lemmon Survey || — || align=right | 1.4 km || 
|-id=777 bgcolor=#d6d6d6
| 202777 ||  || — || October 14, 2007 || Mount Lemmon || Mount Lemmon Survey || — || align=right | 3.8 km || 
|-id=778 bgcolor=#d6d6d6
| 202778 Dmytria ||  ||  || October 16, 2007 || Andrushivka || Andrushivka Obs. || — || align=right | 4.4 km || 
|-id=779 bgcolor=#d6d6d6
| 202779 ||  || — || October 18, 2007 || Anderson Mesa || LONEOS || — || align=right | 4.4 km || 
|-id=780 bgcolor=#E9E9E9
| 202780 ||  || — || November 5, 2007 || Kitt Peak || Spacewatch || — || align=right | 1.1 km || 
|-id=781 bgcolor=#E9E9E9
| 202781 ||  || — || November 11, 2007 || Catalina || CSS || — || align=right | 2.4 km || 
|-id=782 bgcolor=#d6d6d6
| 202782 ||  || — || November 12, 2007 || Catalina || CSS || — || align=right | 5.1 km || 
|-id=783 bgcolor=#C2FFFF
| 202783 ||  || — || December 19, 2007 || Mount Lemmon || Mount Lemmon Survey || L4 || align=right | 22 km || 
|-id=784 bgcolor=#d6d6d6
| 202784 Gangkeda ||  ||  || February 29, 2008 || XuYi || PMO NEO || CHA || align=right | 2.9 km || 
|-id=785 bgcolor=#fefefe
| 202785 ||  || — || April 4, 2008 || Kitt Peak || Spacewatch || — || align=right data-sort-value="0.83" | 830 m || 
|-id=786 bgcolor=#d6d6d6
| 202786 ||  || — || June 28, 2008 || Siding Spring || SSS || Tj (2.99) || align=right | 7.4 km || 
|-id=787 bgcolor=#fefefe
| 202787 Kestecher || 2008 OG ||  || July 25, 2008 || OAM || OAM Obs. || EUT || align=right data-sort-value="0.94" | 940 m || 
|-id=788 bgcolor=#fefefe
| 202788 ||  || — || July 30, 2008 || Mount Lemmon || Mount Lemmon Survey || — || align=right | 1.0 km || 
|-id=789 bgcolor=#d6d6d6
| 202789 ||  || — || August 9, 2008 || Reedy Creek || J. Broughton || EUP || align=right | 6.3 km || 
|-id=790 bgcolor=#fefefe
| 202790 ||  || — || August 25, 2008 || Piszkéstető || K. Sárneczky || — || align=right | 1.3 km || 
|-id=791 bgcolor=#C2FFFF
| 202791 ||  || — || August 24, 2008 || OAM || OAM Obs. || L4ARK || align=right | 13 km || 
|-id=792 bgcolor=#d6d6d6
| 202792 ||  || — || August 25, 2008 || Reedy Creek || J. Broughton || EOS || align=right | 3.6 km || 
|-id=793 bgcolor=#E9E9E9
| 202793 ||  || — || August 27, 2008 || OAM || OAM Obs. || — || align=right | 1.8 km || 
|-id=794 bgcolor=#d6d6d6
| 202794 ||  || — || August 25, 2008 || OAM || OAM Obs. || EOS || align=right | 2.9 km || 
|-id=795 bgcolor=#d6d6d6
| 202795 ||  || — || August 27, 2008 || OAM || OAM Obs. || KOR || align=right | 1.9 km || 
|-id=796 bgcolor=#fefefe
| 202796 ||  || — || August 24, 2008 || OAM || OAM Obs. || — || align=right | 1.2 km || 
|-id=797 bgcolor=#C2FFFF
| 202797 ||  || — || August 30, 2008 || Socorro || LINEAR || L4 || align=right | 13 km || 
|-id=798 bgcolor=#E9E9E9
| 202798 ||  || — || August 21, 2008 || Kitt Peak || Spacewatch || AGN || align=right | 1.5 km || 
|-id=799 bgcolor=#fefefe
| 202799 ||  || — || September 3, 2008 || OAM || OAM Obs. || NYS || align=right | 1.0 km || 
|-id=800 bgcolor=#E9E9E9
| 202800 ||  || — || September 2, 2008 || Kitt Peak || Spacewatch || — || align=right | 4.1 km || 
|}

202801–202900 

|-bgcolor=#E9E9E9
| 202801 ||  || — || September 2, 2008 || Kitt Peak || Spacewatch || — || align=right | 1.7 km || 
|-id=802 bgcolor=#E9E9E9
| 202802 ||  || — || September 9, 2008 || Bergisch Gladbach || W. Bickel || GEF || align=right | 4.2 km || 
|-id=803 bgcolor=#E9E9E9
| 202803 ||  || — || September 6, 2008 || Mount Lemmon || Mount Lemmon Survey || — || align=right | 1.8 km || 
|-id=804 bgcolor=#E9E9E9
| 202804 ||  || — || September 7, 2008 || Mount Lemmon || Mount Lemmon Survey || — || align=right | 2.8 km || 
|-id=805 bgcolor=#d6d6d6
| 202805 ||  || — || September 7, 2008 || Mount Lemmon || Mount Lemmon Survey || — || align=right | 4.4 km || 
|-id=806 bgcolor=#fefefe
| 202806 Sierrastars ||  ||  || September 23, 2008 || Sierra Stars || F. Tozzi || — || align=right data-sort-value="0.92" | 920 m || 
|-id=807 bgcolor=#d6d6d6
| 202807 ||  || — || September 25, 2008 || Prairie Grass || Prairie Grass Obs. || — || align=right | 5.8 km || 
|-id=808 bgcolor=#d6d6d6
| 202808 ||  || — || September 19, 2008 || Kitt Peak || Spacewatch || — || align=right | 3.2 km || 
|-id=809 bgcolor=#d6d6d6
| 202809 ||  || — || September 20, 2008 || Mount Lemmon || Mount Lemmon Survey || K-2 || align=right | 2.0 km || 
|-id=810 bgcolor=#d6d6d6
| 202810 ||  || — || September 20, 2008 || Catalina || CSS || — || align=right | 3.4 km || 
|-id=811 bgcolor=#E9E9E9
| 202811 ||  || — || September 20, 2008 || Kitt Peak || Spacewatch || — || align=right | 3.7 km || 
|-id=812 bgcolor=#E9E9E9
| 202812 ||  || — || September 20, 2008 || Kitt Peak || Spacewatch || — || align=right | 2.4 km || 
|-id=813 bgcolor=#E9E9E9
| 202813 ||  || — || September 20, 2008 || Mount Lemmon || Mount Lemmon Survey || — || align=right data-sort-value="0.92" | 920 m || 
|-id=814 bgcolor=#E9E9E9
| 202814 ||  || — || September 20, 2008 || Catalina || CSS || — || align=right | 3.9 km || 
|-id=815 bgcolor=#d6d6d6
| 202815 ||  || — || September 21, 2008 || Kitt Peak || Spacewatch || EOS || align=right | 2.6 km || 
|-id=816 bgcolor=#fefefe
| 202816 ||  || — || September 21, 2008 || Kitt Peak || Spacewatch || — || align=right data-sort-value="0.85" | 850 m || 
|-id=817 bgcolor=#E9E9E9
| 202817 ||  || — || September 21, 2008 || Mount Lemmon || Mount Lemmon Survey || HEN || align=right | 1.7 km || 
|-id=818 bgcolor=#E9E9E9
| 202818 ||  || — || September 23, 2008 || Catalina || CSS || AER || align=right | 2.2 km || 
|-id=819 bgcolor=#E9E9E9
| 202819 Carlosanchez ||  ||  || September 26, 2008 || La Cañada || J. Lacruz || WIT || align=right | 1.1 km || 
|-id=820 bgcolor=#fefefe
| 202820 ||  || — || September 20, 2008 || Kitt Peak || Spacewatch || — || align=right | 1.1 km || 
|-id=821 bgcolor=#E9E9E9
| 202821 ||  || — || September 21, 2008 || Kitt Peak || Spacewatch || — || align=right | 1.1 km || 
|-id=822 bgcolor=#d6d6d6
| 202822 ||  || — || September 21, 2008 || Kitt Peak || Spacewatch || — || align=right | 3.2 km || 
|-id=823 bgcolor=#d6d6d6
| 202823 ||  || — || September 22, 2008 || Kitt Peak || Spacewatch || — || align=right | 4.0 km || 
|-id=824 bgcolor=#C2FFFF
| 202824 ||  || — || September 22, 2008 || Kitt Peak || Spacewatch || L4 || align=right | 12 km || 
|-id=825 bgcolor=#d6d6d6
| 202825 ||  || — || September 22, 2008 || Kitt Peak || Spacewatch || — || align=right | 4.7 km || 
|-id=826 bgcolor=#E9E9E9
| 202826 ||  || — || September 22, 2008 || Mount Lemmon || Mount Lemmon Survey || — || align=right | 4.1 km || 
|-id=827 bgcolor=#d6d6d6
| 202827 ||  || — || September 24, 2008 || Mount Lemmon || Mount Lemmon Survey || K-2 || align=right | 2.2 km || 
|-id=828 bgcolor=#fefefe
| 202828 ||  || — || September 23, 2008 || Socorro || LINEAR || — || align=right | 1.1 km || 
|-id=829 bgcolor=#E9E9E9
| 202829 ||  || — || September 24, 2008 || Socorro || LINEAR || — || align=right | 2.6 km || 
|-id=830 bgcolor=#E9E9E9
| 202830 ||  || — || September 28, 2008 || Socorro || LINEAR || — || align=right | 2.6 km || 
|-id=831 bgcolor=#fefefe
| 202831 ||  || — || September 28, 2008 || Socorro || LINEAR || — || align=right | 1.2 km || 
|-id=832 bgcolor=#fefefe
| 202832 ||  || — || September 25, 2008 || Kitt Peak || Spacewatch || — || align=right | 1.1 km || 
|-id=833 bgcolor=#d6d6d6
| 202833 ||  || — || September 25, 2008 || Kitt Peak || Spacewatch || THM || align=right | 3.3 km || 
|-id=834 bgcolor=#d6d6d6
| 202834 ||  || — || September 25, 2008 || Kitt Peak || Spacewatch || KOR || align=right | 1.7 km || 
|-id=835 bgcolor=#E9E9E9
| 202835 ||  || — || September 25, 2008 || Kitt Peak || Spacewatch || HNA || align=right | 3.7 km || 
|-id=836 bgcolor=#d6d6d6
| 202836 ||  || — || September 26, 2008 || Kitt Peak || Spacewatch || — || align=right | 4.1 km || 
|-id=837 bgcolor=#E9E9E9
| 202837 ||  || — || September 26, 2008 || Kitt Peak || Spacewatch || — || align=right | 1.4 km || 
|-id=838 bgcolor=#E9E9E9
| 202838 ||  || — || September 26, 2008 || Kitt Peak || Spacewatch || — || align=right | 1.5 km || 
|-id=839 bgcolor=#fefefe
| 202839 ||  || — || September 30, 2008 || OAM || OAM Obs. || — || align=right data-sort-value="0.94" | 940 m || 
|-id=840 bgcolor=#fefefe
| 202840 ||  || — || September 28, 2008 || Mount Lemmon || Mount Lemmon Survey || FLO || align=right data-sort-value="0.58" | 580 m || 
|-id=841 bgcolor=#d6d6d6
| 202841 ||  || — || September 29, 2008 || Kitt Peak || Spacewatch || THM || align=right | 2.8 km || 
|-id=842 bgcolor=#E9E9E9
| 202842 ||  || — || September 25, 2008 || Kitt Peak || Spacewatch || KON || align=right | 3.2 km || 
|-id=843 bgcolor=#E9E9E9
| 202843 ||  || — || September 25, 2008 || Kitt Peak || Spacewatch || fast? || align=right | 1.2 km || 
|-id=844 bgcolor=#E9E9E9
| 202844 ||  || — || October 3, 2008 || OAM || OAM Obs. || HOF || align=right | 4.7 km || 
|-id=845 bgcolor=#E9E9E9
| 202845 ||  || — || October 1, 2008 || Kitt Peak || Spacewatch || — || align=right | 1.6 km || 
|-id=846 bgcolor=#d6d6d6
| 202846 ||  || — || October 1, 2008 || Mount Lemmon || Mount Lemmon Survey || KOR || align=right | 1.7 km || 
|-id=847 bgcolor=#fefefe
| 202847 ||  || — || October 2, 2008 || Catalina || CSS || — || align=right data-sort-value="0.89" | 890 m || 
|-id=848 bgcolor=#E9E9E9
| 202848 ||  || — || October 2, 2008 || Kitt Peak || Spacewatch || — || align=right | 1.1 km || 
|-id=849 bgcolor=#fefefe
| 202849 ||  || — || October 2, 2008 || Kitt Peak || Spacewatch || MAS || align=right data-sort-value="0.71" | 710 m || 
|-id=850 bgcolor=#C2FFFF
| 202850 ||  || — || October 2, 2008 || Mount Lemmon || Mount Lemmon Survey || L4 || align=right | 11 km || 
|-id=851 bgcolor=#E9E9E9
| 202851 ||  || — || October 3, 2008 || Kitt Peak || Spacewatch || — || align=right | 2.2 km || 
|-id=852 bgcolor=#E9E9E9
| 202852 ||  || — || October 4, 2008 || Črni Vrh || Črni Vrh || — || align=right | 2.4 km || 
|-id=853 bgcolor=#E9E9E9
| 202853 ||  || — || October 5, 2008 || OAM || OAM Obs. || INO || align=right | 1.7 km || 
|-id=854 bgcolor=#C2FFFF
| 202854 ||  || — || October 6, 2008 || Kitt Peak || Spacewatch || L4 || align=right | 14 km || 
|-id=855 bgcolor=#C2FFFF
| 202855 ||  || — || October 6, 2008 || Mount Lemmon || Mount Lemmon Survey || L4 || align=right | 19 km || 
|-id=856 bgcolor=#E9E9E9
| 202856 ||  || — || October 6, 2008 || Catalina || CSS || — || align=right | 3.3 km || 
|-id=857 bgcolor=#d6d6d6
| 202857 ||  || — || October 6, 2008 || Kitt Peak || Spacewatch || TIR || align=right | 4.0 km || 
|-id=858 bgcolor=#E9E9E9
| 202858 ||  || — || October 6, 2008 || Kitt Peak || Spacewatch || XIZ || align=right | 2.7 km || 
|-id=859 bgcolor=#E9E9E9
| 202859 ||  || — || October 8, 2008 || Mount Lemmon || Mount Lemmon Survey || — || align=right | 1.2 km || 
|-id=860 bgcolor=#d6d6d6
| 202860 ||  || — || October 8, 2008 || Mount Lemmon || Mount Lemmon Survey || LAU || align=right | 1.2 km || 
|-id=861 bgcolor=#fefefe
| 202861 ||  || — || October 8, 2008 || Catalina || CSS || FLO || align=right data-sort-value="0.83" | 830 m || 
|-id=862 bgcolor=#E9E9E9
| 202862 ||  || — || October 8, 2008 || Catalina || CSS || — || align=right | 1.4 km || 
|-id=863 bgcolor=#d6d6d6
| 202863 ||  || — || October 1, 2008 || Mount Lemmon || Mount Lemmon Survey || — || align=right | 3.0 km || 
|-id=864 bgcolor=#fefefe
| 202864 ||  || — || October 23, 2008 || Bergisch Gladbach || W. Bickel || — || align=right data-sort-value="0.96" | 960 m || 
|-id=865 bgcolor=#fefefe
| 202865 ||  || — || October 22, 2008 || Kitt Peak || Spacewatch || — || align=right | 2.6 km || 
|-id=866 bgcolor=#E9E9E9
| 202866 ||  || — || October 20, 2008 || Kitt Peak || Spacewatch || — || align=right | 2.9 km || 
|-id=867 bgcolor=#E9E9E9
| 202867 ||  || — || October 20, 2008 || Kitt Peak || Spacewatch || HEN || align=right | 1.4 km || 
|-id=868 bgcolor=#d6d6d6
| 202868 ||  || — || October 20, 2008 || Kitt Peak || Spacewatch || — || align=right | 3.8 km || 
|-id=869 bgcolor=#E9E9E9
| 202869 ||  || — || October 20, 2008 || Kitt Peak || Spacewatch || RAF || align=right | 1.4 km || 
|-id=870 bgcolor=#E9E9E9
| 202870 ||  || — || October 21, 2008 || Kitt Peak || Spacewatch || — || align=right | 2.8 km || 
|-id=871 bgcolor=#d6d6d6
| 202871 ||  || — || October 23, 2008 || Socorro || LINEAR || — || align=right | 4.1 km || 
|-id=872 bgcolor=#d6d6d6
| 202872 ||  || — || October 21, 2008 || Kitt Peak || Spacewatch || — || align=right | 3.3 km || 
|-id=873 bgcolor=#E9E9E9
| 202873 ||  || — || October 22, 2008 || Kitt Peak || Spacewatch || — || align=right | 1.4 km || 
|-id=874 bgcolor=#E9E9E9
| 202874 ||  || — || October 22, 2008 || Kitt Peak || Spacewatch || — || align=right | 3.0 km || 
|-id=875 bgcolor=#fefefe
| 202875 ||  || — || October 23, 2008 || Kitt Peak || Spacewatch || — || align=right | 1.0 km || 
|-id=876 bgcolor=#d6d6d6
| 202876 ||  || — || October 23, 2008 || Kitt Peak || Spacewatch || KOR || align=right | 1.5 km || 
|-id=877 bgcolor=#E9E9E9
| 202877 ||  || — || October 23, 2008 || Kitt Peak || Spacewatch || — || align=right | 1.0 km || 
|-id=878 bgcolor=#fefefe
| 202878 ||  || — || October 24, 2008 || Kitt Peak || Spacewatch || — || align=right data-sort-value="0.90" | 900 m || 
|-id=879 bgcolor=#d6d6d6
| 202879 ||  || — || October 27, 2008 || Kitt Peak || Spacewatch || — || align=right | 3.7 km || 
|-id=880 bgcolor=#fefefe
| 202880 ||  || — || October 27, 2008 || Kitt Peak || Spacewatch || — || align=right | 2.4 km || 
|-id=881 bgcolor=#E9E9E9
| 202881 ||  || — || October 28, 2008 || Kitt Peak || Spacewatch || — || align=right | 1.7 km || 
|-id=882 bgcolor=#E9E9E9
| 202882 ||  || — || October 30, 2008 || Kitt Peak || Spacewatch || — || align=right | 2.1 km || 
|-id=883 bgcolor=#E9E9E9
| 202883 || 4723 P-L || — || September 24, 1960 || Palomar || PLS || — || align=right | 2.8 km || 
|-id=884 bgcolor=#E9E9E9
| 202884 || 7590 P-L || — || October 17, 1960 || Palomar || PLS || — || align=right | 2.2 km || 
|-id=885 bgcolor=#fefefe
| 202885 || 3095 T-2 || — || September 30, 1973 || Palomar || PLS || — || align=right | 1.0 km || 
|-id=886 bgcolor=#fefefe
| 202886 ||  || — || July 24, 1979 || Siding Spring || S. J. Bus || — || align=right | 1.4 km || 
|-id=887 bgcolor=#E9E9E9
| 202887 ||  || — || March 1, 1981 || Siding Spring || S. J. Bus || — || align=right | 4.1 km || 
|-id=888 bgcolor=#fefefe
| 202888 ||  || — || March 2, 1981 || Siding Spring || S. J. Bus || V || align=right data-sort-value="0.93" | 930 m || 
|-id=889 bgcolor=#E9E9E9
| 202889 ||  || — || October 6, 1991 || Palomar || A. Lowe || — || align=right | 1.5 km || 
|-id=890 bgcolor=#d6d6d6
| 202890 ||  || — || November 3, 1991 || Kitt Peak || Spacewatch || HYG || align=right | 4.5 km || 
|-id=891 bgcolor=#E9E9E9
| 202891 ||  || — || March 2, 1992 || La Silla || UESAC || MIS || align=right | 3.5 km || 
|-id=892 bgcolor=#fefefe
| 202892 || 1993 SP || — || September 18, 1993 || Kitt Peak || Spacewatch || — || align=right | 1.2 km || 
|-id=893 bgcolor=#fefefe
| 202893 ||  || — || October 9, 1993 || La Silla || E. W. Elst || NYS || align=right | 1.1 km || 
|-id=894 bgcolor=#fefefe
| 202894 ||  || — || November 28, 1994 || Kitt Peak || Spacewatch || — || align=right data-sort-value="0.65" | 650 m || 
|-id=895 bgcolor=#fefefe
| 202895 || 1994 YP || — || December 28, 1994 || Oizumi || T. Kobayashi || — || align=right | 1.4 km || 
|-id=896 bgcolor=#fefefe
| 202896 ||  || — || February 24, 1995 || Kitt Peak || Spacewatch || NYS || align=right data-sort-value="0.85" | 850 m || 
|-id=897 bgcolor=#fefefe
| 202897 ||  || — || February 24, 1995 || Kitt Peak || Spacewatch || NYS || align=right data-sort-value="0.94" | 940 m || 
|-id=898 bgcolor=#d6d6d6
| 202898 ||  || — || March 27, 1995 || Kitt Peak || Spacewatch || — || align=right | 4.3 km || 
|-id=899 bgcolor=#fefefe
| 202899 ||  || — || March 28, 1995 || Kitt Peak || Spacewatch || MAS || align=right data-sort-value="0.88" | 880 m || 
|-id=900 bgcolor=#fefefe
| 202900 ||  || — || March 31, 1995 || Kitt Peak || Spacewatch || MAS || align=right | 1.4 km || 
|}

202901–203000 

|-bgcolor=#E9E9E9
| 202901 ||  || — || July 30, 1995 || Kitt Peak || Spacewatch || — || align=right | 1.8 km || 
|-id=902 bgcolor=#E9E9E9
| 202902 ||  || — || September 18, 1995 || Kitt Peak || Spacewatch || — || align=right | 1.0 km || 
|-id=903 bgcolor=#E9E9E9
| 202903 ||  || — || September 26, 1995 || Kitt Peak || Spacewatch || MIS || align=right | 3.0 km || 
|-id=904 bgcolor=#E9E9E9
| 202904 ||  || — || October 19, 1995 || Kitt Peak || Spacewatch || — || align=right | 1.9 km || 
|-id=905 bgcolor=#fefefe
| 202905 ||  || — || October 21, 1995 || Kitt Peak || Spacewatch || — || align=right data-sort-value="0.98" | 980 m || 
|-id=906 bgcolor=#E9E9E9
| 202906 ||  || — || November 16, 1995 || Kitt Peak || Spacewatch || — || align=right | 1.4 km || 
|-id=907 bgcolor=#fefefe
| 202907 ||  || — || September 4, 1996 || La Silla || U. Carsenty, S. Mottola || — || align=right | 1.6 km || 
|-id=908 bgcolor=#fefefe
| 202908 ||  || — || October 11, 1996 || Kitami || K. Endate || — || align=right | 1.4 km || 
|-id=909 bgcolor=#d6d6d6
| 202909 Jakoten ||  ||  || October 11, 1996 || Kuma Kogen || A. Nakamura || — || align=right | 5.5 km || 
|-id=910 bgcolor=#fefefe
| 202910 ||  || — || November 5, 1996 || Kitt Peak || Spacewatch || MAS || align=right | 1.00 km || 
|-id=911 bgcolor=#E9E9E9
| 202911 ||  || — || March 3, 1997 || Kitt Peak || Spacewatch || — || align=right | 1.4 km || 
|-id=912 bgcolor=#E9E9E9
| 202912 ||  || — || June 30, 1997 || Kitt Peak || Spacewatch || AGN || align=right | 1.8 km || 
|-id=913 bgcolor=#fefefe
| 202913 ||  || — || July 7, 1997 || Kitt Peak || Spacewatch || — || align=right | 1.4 km || 
|-id=914 bgcolor=#FA8072
| 202914 || 1997 PA || — || August 1, 1997 || Haleakala || NEAT || — || align=right | 1.5 km || 
|-id=915 bgcolor=#fefefe
| 202915 ||  || — || October 2, 1997 || Caussols || ODAS || — || align=right | 1.1 km || 
|-id=916 bgcolor=#fefefe
| 202916 ||  || — || October 2, 1997 || Kitt Peak || Spacewatch || — || align=right | 1.0 km || 
|-id=917 bgcolor=#d6d6d6
| 202917 ||  || — || November 23, 1997 || Kitt Peak || Spacewatch || — || align=right | 4.5 km || 
|-id=918 bgcolor=#d6d6d6
| 202918 ||  || — || November 25, 1997 || Kitt Peak || Spacewatch || — || align=right | 3.1 km || 
|-id=919 bgcolor=#fefefe
| 202919 ||  || — || December 21, 1997 || Kitt Peak || Spacewatch || MAS || align=right data-sort-value="0.94" | 940 m || 
|-id=920 bgcolor=#fefefe
| 202920 ||  || — || December 29, 1997 || Xinglong || SCAP || — || align=right | 1.3 km || 
|-id=921 bgcolor=#d6d6d6
| 202921 ||  || — || January 1, 1998 || Kitt Peak || Spacewatch || THM || align=right | 3.4 km || 
|-id=922 bgcolor=#fefefe
| 202922 ||  || — || March 20, 1998 || Socorro || LINEAR || — || align=right | 1.5 km || 
|-id=923 bgcolor=#E9E9E9
| 202923 ||  || — || May 2, 1998 || Caussols || ODAS || — || align=right | 1.6 km || 
|-id=924 bgcolor=#E9E9E9
| 202924 ||  || — || July 29, 1998 || Caussols || ODAS || NEM || align=right | 3.3 km || 
|-id=925 bgcolor=#E9E9E9
| 202925 ||  || — || August 22, 1998 || Xinglong || SCAP || — || align=right | 2.8 km || 
|-id=926 bgcolor=#E9E9E9
| 202926 ||  || — || August 24, 1998 || Socorro || LINEAR || — || align=right | 3.1 km || 
|-id=927 bgcolor=#fefefe
| 202927 ||  || — || September 26, 1998 || Socorro || LINEAR || — || align=right data-sort-value="0.89" | 890 m || 
|-id=928 bgcolor=#fefefe
| 202928 ||  || — || September 26, 1998 || Socorro || LINEAR || — || align=right data-sort-value="0.92" | 920 m || 
|-id=929 bgcolor=#E9E9E9
| 202929 ||  || — || September 26, 1998 || Socorro || LINEAR || — || align=right | 3.2 km || 
|-id=930 bgcolor=#E9E9E9
| 202930 Ivezić ||  ||  || September 19, 1998 || Apache Point || SDSS || NEM || align=right | 2.7 km || 
|-id=931 bgcolor=#d6d6d6
| 202931 ||  || — || October 12, 1998 || Kitt Peak || Spacewatch || — || align=right | 2.6 km || 
|-id=932 bgcolor=#fefefe
| 202932 ||  || — || October 15, 1998 || Kitt Peak || Spacewatch || — || align=right data-sort-value="0.78" | 780 m || 
|-id=933 bgcolor=#d6d6d6
| 202933 ||  || — || November 14, 1998 || Kitt Peak || Spacewatch || KOR || align=right | 1.7 km || 
|-id=934 bgcolor=#d6d6d6
| 202934 ||  || — || November 21, 1998 || Kitt Peak || Spacewatch || — || align=right | 3.5 km || 
|-id=935 bgcolor=#d6d6d6
| 202935 ||  || — || December 22, 1998 || Kitt Peak || Spacewatch || — || align=right | 2.9 km || 
|-id=936 bgcolor=#fefefe
| 202936 ||  || — || December 26, 1998 || Kitt Peak || Spacewatch || FLO || align=right data-sort-value="0.95" | 950 m || 
|-id=937 bgcolor=#fefefe
| 202937 ||  || — || January 11, 1999 || Kitt Peak || Spacewatch || FLO || align=right data-sort-value="0.86" | 860 m || 
|-id=938 bgcolor=#d6d6d6
| 202938 ||  || — || January 13, 1999 || Kitt Peak || Spacewatch || — || align=right | 4.6 km || 
|-id=939 bgcolor=#fefefe
| 202939 ||  || — || January 15, 1999 || Caussols || ODAS || — || align=right | 1.2 km || 
|-id=940 bgcolor=#fefefe
| 202940 ||  || — || February 12, 1999 || Oizumi || T. Kobayashi || — || align=right | 1.3 km || 
|-id=941 bgcolor=#fefefe
| 202941 ||  || — || February 12, 1999 || Uenohara || N. Kawasato || — || align=right | 1.2 km || 
|-id=942 bgcolor=#fefefe
| 202942 ||  || — || February 10, 1999 || Socorro || LINEAR || — || align=right | 1.2 km || 
|-id=943 bgcolor=#d6d6d6
| 202943 || 1999 EO || — || March 6, 1999 || Kitt Peak || Spacewatch || — || align=right | 3.0 km || 
|-id=944 bgcolor=#d6d6d6
| 202944 ||  || — || March 16, 1999 || Kitt Peak || Spacewatch || — || align=right | 4.0 km || 
|-id=945 bgcolor=#d6d6d6
| 202945 ||  || — || March 20, 1999 || Apache Point || SDSS || — || align=right | 4.5 km || 
|-id=946 bgcolor=#fefefe
| 202946 ||  || — || March 21, 1999 || Apache Point || SDSS || — || align=right | 1.5 km || 
|-id=947 bgcolor=#fefefe
| 202947 ||  || — || April 11, 1999 || Kitt Peak || Spacewatch || — || align=right data-sort-value="0.79" | 790 m || 
|-id=948 bgcolor=#fefefe
| 202948 ||  || — || May 10, 1999 || Socorro || LINEAR || NYS || align=right data-sort-value="0.99" | 990 m || 
|-id=949 bgcolor=#fefefe
| 202949 ||  || — || May 12, 1999 || Socorro || LINEAR || — || align=right | 2.9 km || 
|-id=950 bgcolor=#fefefe
| 202950 ||  || — || May 13, 1999 || Socorro || LINEAR || V || align=right | 1.2 km || 
|-id=951 bgcolor=#E9E9E9
| 202951 || 1999 RE || — || September 3, 1999 || Ondřejov || L. Kotková || IAN || align=right | 1.8 km || 
|-id=952 bgcolor=#E9E9E9
| 202952 ||  || — || September 7, 1999 || Socorro || LINEAR || RAF || align=right | 1.7 km || 
|-id=953 bgcolor=#E9E9E9
| 202953 ||  || — || September 8, 1999 || Uccle || T. Pauwels || — || align=right | 2.3 km || 
|-id=954 bgcolor=#E9E9E9
| 202954 ||  || — || September 7, 1999 || Socorro || LINEAR || — || align=right | 1.3 km || 
|-id=955 bgcolor=#E9E9E9
| 202955 ||  || — || September 7, 1999 || Socorro || LINEAR || — || align=right | 1.4 km || 
|-id=956 bgcolor=#E9E9E9
| 202956 ||  || — || September 7, 1999 || Socorro || LINEAR || — || align=right | 2.3 km || 
|-id=957 bgcolor=#E9E9E9
| 202957 ||  || — || September 8, 1999 || Socorro || LINEAR || MIT || align=right | 4.3 km || 
|-id=958 bgcolor=#E9E9E9
| 202958 ||  || — || September 8, 1999 || Socorro || LINEAR || — || align=right | 5.7 km || 
|-id=959 bgcolor=#E9E9E9
| 202959 ||  || — || September 9, 1999 || Socorro || LINEAR || — || align=right | 2.5 km || 
|-id=960 bgcolor=#E9E9E9
| 202960 ||  || — || September 9, 1999 || Socorro || LINEAR || — || align=right | 2.3 km || 
|-id=961 bgcolor=#E9E9E9
| 202961 ||  || — || September 9, 1999 || Socorro || LINEAR || — || align=right | 1.3 km || 
|-id=962 bgcolor=#E9E9E9
| 202962 ||  || — || September 4, 1999 || Catalina || CSS || — || align=right | 2.3 km || 
|-id=963 bgcolor=#E9E9E9
| 202963 ||  || — || September 4, 1999 || Anderson Mesa || LONEOS || — || align=right | 1.7 km || 
|-id=964 bgcolor=#E9E9E9
| 202964 ||  || — || October 12, 1999 || Ondřejov || P. Kušnirák, P. Pravec || — || align=right | 2.4 km || 
|-id=965 bgcolor=#d6d6d6
| 202965 ||  || — || October 4, 1999 || Socorro || LINEAR || 3:2 || align=right | 5.7 km || 
|-id=966 bgcolor=#E9E9E9
| 202966 ||  || — || October 4, 1999 || Socorro || LINEAR || MAR || align=right | 1.7 km || 
|-id=967 bgcolor=#E9E9E9
| 202967 ||  || — || October 9, 1999 || Kitt Peak || Spacewatch || — || align=right | 2.0 km || 
|-id=968 bgcolor=#E9E9E9
| 202968 ||  || — || October 9, 1999 || Kitt Peak || Spacewatch || — || align=right | 1.9 km || 
|-id=969 bgcolor=#E9E9E9
| 202969 ||  || — || October 10, 1999 || Kitt Peak || Spacewatch || — || align=right | 1.4 km || 
|-id=970 bgcolor=#E9E9E9
| 202970 ||  || — || October 11, 1999 || Kitt Peak || Spacewatch || — || align=right | 1.6 km || 
|-id=971 bgcolor=#E9E9E9
| 202971 ||  || — || October 2, 1999 || Socorro || LINEAR || — || align=right | 2.2 km || 
|-id=972 bgcolor=#E9E9E9
| 202972 ||  || — || October 2, 1999 || Socorro || LINEAR || — || align=right | 3.9 km || 
|-id=973 bgcolor=#E9E9E9
| 202973 ||  || — || October 2, 1999 || Socorro || LINEAR || — || align=right | 3.7 km || 
|-id=974 bgcolor=#E9E9E9
| 202974 ||  || — || October 4, 1999 || Socorro || LINEAR || — || align=right | 2.4 km || 
|-id=975 bgcolor=#d6d6d6
| 202975 ||  || — || October 4, 1999 || Socorro || LINEAR || 3:2 || align=right | 5.6 km || 
|-id=976 bgcolor=#E9E9E9
| 202976 ||  || — || October 6, 1999 || Socorro || LINEAR || — || align=right | 2.4 km || 
|-id=977 bgcolor=#E9E9E9
| 202977 ||  || — || October 9, 1999 || Socorro || LINEAR || — || align=right | 1.4 km || 
|-id=978 bgcolor=#E9E9E9
| 202978 ||  || — || October 10, 1999 || Socorro || LINEAR || — || align=right | 1.8 km || 
|-id=979 bgcolor=#E9E9E9
| 202979 ||  || — || October 13, 1999 || Socorro || LINEAR || — || align=right | 1.3 km || 
|-id=980 bgcolor=#E9E9E9
| 202980 ||  || — || October 2, 1999 || Socorro || LINEAR || — || align=right | 2.1 km || 
|-id=981 bgcolor=#E9E9E9
| 202981 ||  || — || October 4, 1999 || Catalina || CSS || — || align=right | 2.8 km || 
|-id=982 bgcolor=#d6d6d6
| 202982 ||  || — || October 4, 1999 || Catalina || CSS || SHU3:2 || align=right | 9.9 km || 
|-id=983 bgcolor=#E9E9E9
| 202983 ||  || — || October 3, 1999 || Socorro || LINEAR || — || align=right | 2.9 km || 
|-id=984 bgcolor=#E9E9E9
| 202984 ||  || — || October 31, 1999 || Kitt Peak || Spacewatch || ADE || align=right | 2.9 km || 
|-id=985 bgcolor=#E9E9E9
| 202985 ||  || — || November 2, 1999 || Kitt Peak || Spacewatch || — || align=right | 1.5 km || 
|-id=986 bgcolor=#E9E9E9
| 202986 ||  || — || November 3, 1999 || Socorro || LINEAR || — || align=right | 2.1 km || 
|-id=987 bgcolor=#E9E9E9
| 202987 ||  || — || November 1, 1999 || Kitt Peak || Spacewatch || — || align=right | 1.8 km || 
|-id=988 bgcolor=#E9E9E9
| 202988 ||  || — || November 4, 1999 || Kitt Peak || Spacewatch || — || align=right | 2.0 km || 
|-id=989 bgcolor=#E9E9E9
| 202989 ||  || — || November 4, 1999 || Socorro || LINEAR || — || align=right | 2.4 km || 
|-id=990 bgcolor=#E9E9E9
| 202990 ||  || — || November 9, 1999 || Socorro || LINEAR || HOF || align=right | 4.4 km || 
|-id=991 bgcolor=#E9E9E9
| 202991 ||  || — || November 9, 1999 || Socorro || LINEAR || NEM || align=right | 2.9 km || 
|-id=992 bgcolor=#d6d6d6
| 202992 ||  || — || November 13, 1999 || Kitt Peak || Spacewatch || Tj (2.97) || align=right | 5.3 km || 
|-id=993 bgcolor=#E9E9E9
| 202993 ||  || — || November 7, 1999 || Socorro || LINEAR || — || align=right | 2.8 km || 
|-id=994 bgcolor=#E9E9E9
| 202994 ||  || — || November 9, 1999 || Kitt Peak || Spacewatch || GEF || align=right | 1.7 km || 
|-id=995 bgcolor=#E9E9E9
| 202995 ||  || — || November 10, 1999 || Kitt Peak || Spacewatch || — || align=right | 1.4 km || 
|-id=996 bgcolor=#E9E9E9
| 202996 ||  || — || November 14, 1999 || Socorro || LINEAR || — || align=right | 3.2 km || 
|-id=997 bgcolor=#E9E9E9
| 202997 ||  || — || November 12, 1999 || Kitt Peak || Spacewatch || — || align=right | 1.8 km || 
|-id=998 bgcolor=#E9E9E9
| 202998 ||  || — || November 12, 1999 || Socorro || LINEAR || — || align=right | 1.8 km || 
|-id=999 bgcolor=#E9E9E9
| 202999 ||  || — || November 15, 1999 || Socorro || LINEAR || — || align=right | 2.6 km || 
|-id=000 bgcolor=#E9E9E9
| 203000 ||  || — || November 3, 1999 || Catalina || CSS || RAF || align=right | 1.8 km || 
|}

References

External links 
 Discovery Circumstances: Numbered Minor Planets (200001)–(205000) (IAU Minor Planet Center)

0202